

125001–125100 

|-bgcolor=#fefefe
| 125001 ||  || — || October 15, 2001 || Palomar || NEAT || V || align=right | 1.6 km || 
|-id=002 bgcolor=#fefefe
| 125002 ||  || — || October 15, 2001 || Palomar || NEAT || V || align=right | 1.7 km || 
|-id=003 bgcolor=#fefefe
| 125003 ||  || — || October 15, 2001 || Palomar || NEAT || — || align=right | 2.6 km || 
|-id=004 bgcolor=#fefefe
| 125004 ||  || — || October 14, 2001 || Kitt Peak || Spacewatch || FLO || align=right data-sort-value="0.95" | 950 m || 
|-id=005 bgcolor=#fefefe
| 125005 ||  || — || October 14, 2001 || Kitt Peak || Spacewatch || — || align=right | 2.0 km || 
|-id=006 bgcolor=#fefefe
| 125006 ||  || — || October 11, 2001 || Palomar || NEAT || — || align=right | 1.5 km || 
|-id=007 bgcolor=#fefefe
| 125007 ||  || — || October 11, 2001 || Palomar || NEAT || — || align=right | 1.5 km || 
|-id=008 bgcolor=#fefefe
| 125008 ||  || — || October 11, 2001 || Palomar || NEAT || — || align=right | 1.4 km || 
|-id=009 bgcolor=#fefefe
| 125009 ||  || — || October 15, 2001 || Palomar || NEAT || — || align=right | 1.3 km || 
|-id=010 bgcolor=#fefefe
| 125010 ||  || — || October 14, 2001 || Socorro || LINEAR || — || align=right | 1.9 km || 
|-id=011 bgcolor=#fefefe
| 125011 ||  || — || October 15, 2001 || Socorro || LINEAR || — || align=right | 1.7 km || 
|-id=012 bgcolor=#fefefe
| 125012 ||  || — || October 15, 2001 || Socorro || LINEAR || — || align=right | 2.0 km || 
|-id=013 bgcolor=#fefefe
| 125013 ||  || — || October 13, 2001 || Palomar || NEAT || — || align=right | 1.5 km || 
|-id=014 bgcolor=#E9E9E9
| 125014 ||  || — || October 13, 2001 || Socorro || LINEAR || — || align=right | 2.0 km || 
|-id=015 bgcolor=#fefefe
| 125015 ||  || — || October 14, 2001 || Socorro || LINEAR || V || align=right | 1.0 km || 
|-id=016 bgcolor=#fefefe
| 125016 ||  || — || October 14, 2001 || Socorro || LINEAR || — || align=right | 1.3 km || 
|-id=017 bgcolor=#fefefe
| 125017 ||  || — || October 14, 2001 || Socorro || LINEAR || — || align=right | 1.3 km || 
|-id=018 bgcolor=#fefefe
| 125018 ||  || — || October 14, 2001 || Socorro || LINEAR || — || align=right | 2.0 km || 
|-id=019 bgcolor=#fefefe
| 125019 ||  || — || October 14, 2001 || Socorro || LINEAR || — || align=right | 1.4 km || 
|-id=020 bgcolor=#fefefe
| 125020 ||  || — || October 14, 2001 || Socorro || LINEAR || V || align=right | 1.1 km || 
|-id=021 bgcolor=#fefefe
| 125021 ||  || — || October 14, 2001 || Socorro || LINEAR || — || align=right | 1.3 km || 
|-id=022 bgcolor=#fefefe
| 125022 ||  || — || October 14, 2001 || Socorro || LINEAR || FLO || align=right | 1.4 km || 
|-id=023 bgcolor=#fefefe
| 125023 ||  || — || October 14, 2001 || Socorro || LINEAR || — || align=right | 1.8 km || 
|-id=024 bgcolor=#fefefe
| 125024 ||  || — || October 14, 2001 || Socorro || LINEAR || NYS || align=right | 3.5 km || 
|-id=025 bgcolor=#fefefe
| 125025 ||  || — || October 14, 2001 || Socorro || LINEAR || — || align=right | 2.1 km || 
|-id=026 bgcolor=#fefefe
| 125026 ||  || — || October 14, 2001 || Socorro || LINEAR || — || align=right | 1.7 km || 
|-id=027 bgcolor=#E9E9E9
| 125027 ||  || — || October 14, 2001 || Socorro || LINEAR || — || align=right | 2.0 km || 
|-id=028 bgcolor=#fefefe
| 125028 ||  || — || October 14, 2001 || Socorro || LINEAR || V || align=right | 1.8 km || 
|-id=029 bgcolor=#fefefe
| 125029 ||  || — || October 14, 2001 || Socorro || LINEAR || — || align=right | 4.1 km || 
|-id=030 bgcolor=#fefefe
| 125030 ||  || — || October 14, 2001 || Socorro || LINEAR || NYS || align=right | 1.3 km || 
|-id=031 bgcolor=#fefefe
| 125031 ||  || — || October 14, 2001 || Socorro || LINEAR || — || align=right | 2.4 km || 
|-id=032 bgcolor=#fefefe
| 125032 ||  || — || October 14, 2001 || Socorro || LINEAR || — || align=right | 1.5 km || 
|-id=033 bgcolor=#fefefe
| 125033 ||  || — || October 14, 2001 || Socorro || LINEAR || FLO || align=right | 2.8 km || 
|-id=034 bgcolor=#fefefe
| 125034 ||  || — || October 14, 2001 || Socorro || LINEAR || — || align=right | 2.4 km || 
|-id=035 bgcolor=#fefefe
| 125035 ||  || — || October 15, 2001 || Socorro || LINEAR || FLO || align=right | 1.6 km || 
|-id=036 bgcolor=#E9E9E9
| 125036 ||  || — || October 15, 2001 || Socorro || LINEAR || — || align=right | 3.1 km || 
|-id=037 bgcolor=#fefefe
| 125037 ||  || — || October 11, 2001 || Socorro || LINEAR || — || align=right | 1.8 km || 
|-id=038 bgcolor=#fefefe
| 125038 ||  || — || October 11, 2001 || Socorro || LINEAR || V || align=right | 1.6 km || 
|-id=039 bgcolor=#fefefe
| 125039 ||  || — || October 11, 2001 || Socorro || LINEAR || — || align=right | 2.9 km || 
|-id=040 bgcolor=#fefefe
| 125040 ||  || — || October 11, 2001 || Socorro || LINEAR || — || align=right | 3.0 km || 
|-id=041 bgcolor=#fefefe
| 125041 ||  || — || October 11, 2001 || Socorro || LINEAR || — || align=right | 2.5 km || 
|-id=042 bgcolor=#fefefe
| 125042 ||  || — || October 11, 2001 || Socorro || LINEAR || — || align=right | 3.2 km || 
|-id=043 bgcolor=#fefefe
| 125043 ||  || — || October 11, 2001 || Palomar || NEAT || — || align=right | 1.3 km || 
|-id=044 bgcolor=#fefefe
| 125044 ||  || — || October 11, 2001 || Palomar || NEAT || NYS || align=right | 1.1 km || 
|-id=045 bgcolor=#C2FFFF
| 125045 ||  || — || October 13, 2001 || Palomar || NEAT || L5 || align=right | 23 km || 
|-id=046 bgcolor=#fefefe
| 125046 ||  || — || October 13, 2001 || Palomar || NEAT || V || align=right | 1.1 km || 
|-id=047 bgcolor=#fefefe
| 125047 ||  || — || October 13, 2001 || Anderson Mesa || LONEOS || FLO || align=right data-sort-value="0.98" | 980 m || 
|-id=048 bgcolor=#C2FFFF
| 125048 ||  || — || October 13, 2001 || Palomar || NEAT || L5 || align=right | 18 km || 
|-id=049 bgcolor=#E9E9E9
| 125049 ||  || — || October 14, 2001 || Anderson Mesa || LONEOS || — || align=right | 1.3 km || 
|-id=050 bgcolor=#fefefe
| 125050 ||  || — || October 14, 2001 || Anderson Mesa || LONEOS || — || align=right | 1.2 km || 
|-id=051 bgcolor=#fefefe
| 125051 ||  || — || October 14, 2001 || Anderson Mesa || LONEOS || — || align=right | 2.1 km || 
|-id=052 bgcolor=#fefefe
| 125052 ||  || — || October 14, 2001 || Socorro || LINEAR || FLO || align=right | 2.0 km || 
|-id=053 bgcolor=#fefefe
| 125053 ||  || — || October 14, 2001 || Socorro || LINEAR || FLO || align=right | 2.5 km || 
|-id=054 bgcolor=#fefefe
| 125054 ||  || — || October 14, 2001 || Kitt Peak || Spacewatch || NYS || align=right | 3.1 km || 
|-id=055 bgcolor=#fefefe
| 125055 ||  || — || October 15, 2001 || Socorro || LINEAR || — || align=right | 3.0 km || 
|-id=056 bgcolor=#fefefe
| 125056 ||  || — || October 15, 2001 || Desert Eagle || W. K. Y. Yeung || KLI || align=right | 3.7 km || 
|-id=057 bgcolor=#fefefe
| 125057 ||  || — || October 15, 2001 || Palomar || NEAT || — || align=right | 1.4 km || 
|-id=058 bgcolor=#fefefe
| 125058 ||  || — || October 15, 2001 || Palomar || NEAT || — || align=right | 3.3 km || 
|-id=059 bgcolor=#C2FFFF
| 125059 ||  || — || October 15, 2001 || Palomar || NEAT || L5 || align=right | 16 km || 
|-id=060 bgcolor=#fefefe
| 125060 ||  || — || October 15, 2001 || Kitt Peak || Spacewatch || — || align=right | 1.7 km || 
|-id=061 bgcolor=#fefefe
| 125061 ||  || — || October 15, 2001 || Kitt Peak || Spacewatch || — || align=right | 1.3 km || 
|-id=062 bgcolor=#C2FFFF
| 125062 ||  || — || October 15, 2001 || Haleakala || NEAT || L5 || align=right | 17 km || 
|-id=063 bgcolor=#fefefe
| 125063 ||  || — || October 15, 2001 || Palomar || NEAT || — || align=right | 1.6 km || 
|-id=064 bgcolor=#E9E9E9
| 125064 ||  || — || October 15, 2001 || Palomar || NEAT || — || align=right | 3.2 km || 
|-id=065 bgcolor=#fefefe
| 125065 ||  || — || October 8, 2001 || Palomar || NEAT || V || align=right | 1.2 km || 
|-id=066 bgcolor=#fefefe
| 125066 ||  || — || October 8, 2001 || Palomar || NEAT || FLO || align=right | 1.3 km || 
|-id=067 bgcolor=#fefefe
| 125067 ||  || — || October 14, 2001 || Anderson Mesa || LONEOS || V || align=right | 1.5 km || 
|-id=068 bgcolor=#fefefe
| 125068 ||  || — || October 14, 2001 || Socorro || LINEAR || — || align=right | 1.8 km || 
|-id=069 bgcolor=#fefefe
| 125069 ||  || — || October 14, 2001 || Socorro || LINEAR || V || align=right | 1.6 km || 
|-id=070 bgcolor=#E9E9E9
| 125070 ||  || — || October 13, 2001 || Kitt Peak || Spacewatch || — || align=right | 3.5 km || 
|-id=071 bgcolor=#fefefe
| 125071 Lugosi ||  ||  || October 8, 2001 || Palomar || K. Sárneczky || — || align=right | 1.5 km || 
|-id=072 bgcolor=#FA8072
| 125072 || 2001 UG || — || October 16, 2001 || Socorro || LINEAR || — || align=right | 1.9 km || 
|-id=073 bgcolor=#fefefe
| 125073 || 2001 UZ || — || October 17, 2001 || Socorro || LINEAR || — || align=right | 2.5 km || 
|-id=074 bgcolor=#fefefe
| 125074 ||  || — || October 16, 2001 || Socorro || LINEAR || NYS || align=right | 3.7 km || 
|-id=075 bgcolor=#fefefe
| 125075 ||  || — || October 21, 2001 || Desert Eagle || W. K. Y. Yeung || ERI || align=right | 3.5 km || 
|-id=076 bgcolor=#fefefe
| 125076 Michelmayor ||  ||  || October 19, 2001 || Vicques || M. Ory || — || align=right | 1.8 km || 
|-id=077 bgcolor=#fefefe
| 125077 ||  || — || October 16, 2001 || Socorro || LINEAR || — || align=right | 1.5 km || 
|-id=078 bgcolor=#fefefe
| 125078 ||  || — || October 17, 2001 || Socorro || LINEAR || — || align=right | 1.4 km || 
|-id=079 bgcolor=#fefefe
| 125079 ||  || — || October 17, 2001 || Socorro || LINEAR || — || align=right | 1.3 km || 
|-id=080 bgcolor=#E9E9E9
| 125080 ||  || — || October 17, 2001 || Socorro || LINEAR || NEM || align=right | 3.8 km || 
|-id=081 bgcolor=#fefefe
| 125081 ||  || — || October 17, 2001 || Socorro || LINEAR || V || align=right | 1.4 km || 
|-id=082 bgcolor=#E9E9E9
| 125082 ||  || — || October 22, 2001 || Desert Eagle || W. K. Y. Yeung || — || align=right | 4.2 km || 
|-id=083 bgcolor=#fefefe
| 125083 ||  || — || October 24, 2001 || Desert Eagle || W. K. Y. Yeung || NYS || align=right | 1.00 km || 
|-id=084 bgcolor=#fefefe
| 125084 ||  || — || October 24, 2001 || Desert Eagle || W. K. Y. Yeung || ERI || align=right | 2.4 km || 
|-id=085 bgcolor=#E9E9E9
| 125085 ||  || — || October 24, 2001 || Desert Eagle || W. K. Y. Yeung || — || align=right | 3.8 km || 
|-id=086 bgcolor=#E9E9E9
| 125086 ||  || — || October 24, 2001 || Desert Eagle || W. K. Y. Yeung || — || align=right | 3.4 km || 
|-id=087 bgcolor=#fefefe
| 125087 ||  || — || October 25, 2001 || Desert Eagle || W. K. Y. Yeung || — || align=right | 1.9 km || 
|-id=088 bgcolor=#fefefe
| 125088 ||  || — || October 17, 2001 || Palomar || NEAT || FLO || align=right | 1.3 km || 
|-id=089 bgcolor=#fefefe
| 125089 ||  || — || October 18, 2001 || Socorro || LINEAR || — || align=right | 1.5 km || 
|-id=090 bgcolor=#fefefe
| 125090 ||  || — || October 18, 2001 || Socorro || LINEAR || — || align=right | 2.3 km || 
|-id=091 bgcolor=#fefefe
| 125091 ||  || — || October 18, 2001 || Socorro || LINEAR || V || align=right | 1.6 km || 
|-id=092 bgcolor=#fefefe
| 125092 ||  || — || October 18, 2001 || Socorro || LINEAR || V || align=right | 1.3 km || 
|-id=093 bgcolor=#fefefe
| 125093 ||  || — || October 18, 2001 || Socorro || LINEAR || — || align=right | 1.9 km || 
|-id=094 bgcolor=#fefefe
| 125094 ||  || — || October 18, 2001 || Socorro || LINEAR || FLO || align=right | 1.3 km || 
|-id=095 bgcolor=#fefefe
| 125095 ||  || — || October 16, 2001 || Socorro || LINEAR || — || align=right | 3.4 km || 
|-id=096 bgcolor=#E9E9E9
| 125096 ||  || — || October 16, 2001 || Socorro || LINEAR || — || align=right | 1.8 km || 
|-id=097 bgcolor=#fefefe
| 125097 ||  || — || October 16, 2001 || Socorro || LINEAR || — || align=right | 1.5 km || 
|-id=098 bgcolor=#fefefe
| 125098 ||  || — || October 16, 2001 || Socorro || LINEAR || V || align=right | 1.1 km || 
|-id=099 bgcolor=#fefefe
| 125099 ||  || — || October 16, 2001 || Socorro || LINEAR || — || align=right | 1.5 km || 
|-id=100 bgcolor=#fefefe
| 125100 ||  || — || October 16, 2001 || Socorro || LINEAR || — || align=right | 2.3 km || 
|}

125101–125200 

|-bgcolor=#fefefe
| 125101 ||  || — || October 16, 2001 || Socorro || LINEAR || V || align=right | 1.0 km || 
|-id=102 bgcolor=#fefefe
| 125102 ||  || — || October 16, 2001 || Socorro || LINEAR || — || align=right | 2.4 km || 
|-id=103 bgcolor=#E9E9E9
| 125103 ||  || — || October 16, 2001 || Socorro || LINEAR || — || align=right | 2.3 km || 
|-id=104 bgcolor=#fefefe
| 125104 ||  || — || October 17, 2001 || Socorro || LINEAR || V || align=right | 1.2 km || 
|-id=105 bgcolor=#E9E9E9
| 125105 ||  || — || October 17, 2001 || Socorro || LINEAR || — || align=right | 3.1 km || 
|-id=106 bgcolor=#C2FFFF
| 125106 ||  || — || October 17, 2001 || Socorro || LINEAR || L5 || align=right | 14 km || 
|-id=107 bgcolor=#fefefe
| 125107 ||  || — || October 17, 2001 || Socorro || LINEAR || MAS || align=right | 1.4 km || 
|-id=108 bgcolor=#fefefe
| 125108 ||  || — || October 17, 2001 || Socorro || LINEAR || MAS || align=right | 1.5 km || 
|-id=109 bgcolor=#fefefe
| 125109 ||  || — || October 17, 2001 || Socorro || LINEAR || — || align=right | 1.6 km || 
|-id=110 bgcolor=#fefefe
| 125110 ||  || — || October 17, 2001 || Socorro || LINEAR || V || align=right | 1.1 km || 
|-id=111 bgcolor=#fefefe
| 125111 ||  || — || October 17, 2001 || Socorro || LINEAR || — || align=right | 1.7 km || 
|-id=112 bgcolor=#fefefe
| 125112 ||  || — || October 17, 2001 || Socorro || LINEAR || — || align=right | 1.2 km || 
|-id=113 bgcolor=#E9E9E9
| 125113 ||  || — || October 17, 2001 || Socorro || LINEAR || — || align=right | 2.0 km || 
|-id=114 bgcolor=#fefefe
| 125114 ||  || — || October 17, 2001 || Socorro || LINEAR || — || align=right | 1.7 km || 
|-id=115 bgcolor=#fefefe
| 125115 ||  || — || October 17, 2001 || Socorro || LINEAR || — || align=right | 2.4 km || 
|-id=116 bgcolor=#fefefe
| 125116 ||  || — || October 17, 2001 || Socorro || LINEAR || — || align=right | 1.6 km || 
|-id=117 bgcolor=#E9E9E9
| 125117 ||  || — || October 17, 2001 || Socorro || LINEAR || — || align=right | 3.1 km || 
|-id=118 bgcolor=#fefefe
| 125118 ||  || — || October 17, 2001 || Socorro || LINEAR || ERI || align=right | 3.5 km || 
|-id=119 bgcolor=#fefefe
| 125119 ||  || — || October 17, 2001 || Socorro || LINEAR || FLO || align=right | 1.0 km || 
|-id=120 bgcolor=#fefefe
| 125120 ||  || — || October 17, 2001 || Socorro || LINEAR || — || align=right | 2.8 km || 
|-id=121 bgcolor=#fefefe
| 125121 ||  || — || October 17, 2001 || Socorro || LINEAR || — || align=right | 2.2 km || 
|-id=122 bgcolor=#fefefe
| 125122 ||  || — || October 17, 2001 || Socorro || LINEAR || — || align=right | 2.3 km || 
|-id=123 bgcolor=#fefefe
| 125123 ||  || — || October 17, 2001 || Socorro || LINEAR || — || align=right | 2.1 km || 
|-id=124 bgcolor=#fefefe
| 125124 ||  || — || October 17, 2001 || Socorro || LINEAR || — || align=right | 1.1 km || 
|-id=125 bgcolor=#fefefe
| 125125 ||  || — || October 17, 2001 || Socorro || LINEAR || — || align=right | 1.5 km || 
|-id=126 bgcolor=#fefefe
| 125126 ||  || — || October 17, 2001 || Socorro || LINEAR || — || align=right | 2.1 km || 
|-id=127 bgcolor=#fefefe
| 125127 ||  || — || October 16, 2001 || Socorro || LINEAR || — || align=right | 1.1 km || 
|-id=128 bgcolor=#fefefe
| 125128 ||  || — || October 17, 2001 || Socorro || LINEAR || — || align=right | 1.5 km || 
|-id=129 bgcolor=#fefefe
| 125129 ||  || — || October 17, 2001 || Socorro || LINEAR || NYS || align=right | 1.1 km || 
|-id=130 bgcolor=#d6d6d6
| 125130 ||  || — || October 17, 2001 || Socorro || LINEAR || 3:2 || align=right | 8.7 km || 
|-id=131 bgcolor=#fefefe
| 125131 ||  || — || October 17, 2001 || Socorro || LINEAR || — || align=right | 1.2 km || 
|-id=132 bgcolor=#fefefe
| 125132 ||  || — || October 17, 2001 || Socorro || LINEAR || V || align=right | 1.9 km || 
|-id=133 bgcolor=#fefefe
| 125133 ||  || — || October 17, 2001 || Socorro || LINEAR || FLO || align=right | 2.1 km || 
|-id=134 bgcolor=#fefefe
| 125134 ||  || — || October 17, 2001 || Socorro || LINEAR || V || align=right | 1.2 km || 
|-id=135 bgcolor=#fefefe
| 125135 ||  || — || October 17, 2001 || Socorro || LINEAR || NYS || align=right | 1.3 km || 
|-id=136 bgcolor=#E9E9E9
| 125136 ||  || — || October 17, 2001 || Socorro || LINEAR || — || align=right | 3.6 km || 
|-id=137 bgcolor=#fefefe
| 125137 ||  || — || October 17, 2001 || Socorro || LINEAR || NYS || align=right data-sort-value="0.96" | 960 m || 
|-id=138 bgcolor=#fefefe
| 125138 ||  || — || October 17, 2001 || Socorro || LINEAR || NYS || align=right | 1.6 km || 
|-id=139 bgcolor=#fefefe
| 125139 ||  || — || October 17, 2001 || Socorro || LINEAR || — || align=right | 1.9 km || 
|-id=140 bgcolor=#fefefe
| 125140 ||  || — || October 17, 2001 || Socorro || LINEAR || NYS || align=right | 1.3 km || 
|-id=141 bgcolor=#fefefe
| 125141 ||  || — || October 18, 2001 || Socorro || LINEAR || EUT || align=right | 1.0 km || 
|-id=142 bgcolor=#fefefe
| 125142 ||  || — || October 18, 2001 || Socorro || LINEAR || V || align=right | 1.4 km || 
|-id=143 bgcolor=#fefefe
| 125143 ||  || — || October 18, 2001 || Socorro || LINEAR || — || align=right | 2.4 km || 
|-id=144 bgcolor=#fefefe
| 125144 ||  || — || October 19, 2001 || Socorro || LINEAR || V || align=right | 1.6 km || 
|-id=145 bgcolor=#fefefe
| 125145 ||  || — || October 17, 2001 || Socorro || LINEAR || NYS || align=right | 1.5 km || 
|-id=146 bgcolor=#E9E9E9
| 125146 ||  || — || October 20, 2001 || Socorro || LINEAR || — || align=right | 1.8 km || 
|-id=147 bgcolor=#fefefe
| 125147 ||  || — || October 20, 2001 || Socorro || LINEAR || — || align=right | 1.4 km || 
|-id=148 bgcolor=#fefefe
| 125148 ||  || — || October 20, 2001 || Socorro || LINEAR || V || align=right | 1.4 km || 
|-id=149 bgcolor=#fefefe
| 125149 ||  || — || October 20, 2001 || Socorro || LINEAR || — || align=right | 1.3 km || 
|-id=150 bgcolor=#fefefe
| 125150 ||  || — || October 20, 2001 || Socorro || LINEAR || FLO || align=right | 1.2 km || 
|-id=151 bgcolor=#fefefe
| 125151 ||  || — || October 20, 2001 || Socorro || LINEAR || MAS || align=right | 1.1 km || 
|-id=152 bgcolor=#fefefe
| 125152 ||  || — || October 20, 2001 || Socorro || LINEAR || — || align=right | 1.2 km || 
|-id=153 bgcolor=#fefefe
| 125153 ||  || — || October 20, 2001 || Socorro || LINEAR || — || align=right | 2.9 km || 
|-id=154 bgcolor=#fefefe
| 125154 ||  || — || October 21, 2001 || Socorro || LINEAR || — || align=right | 2.1 km || 
|-id=155 bgcolor=#fefefe
| 125155 ||  || — || October 18, 2001 || Kitt Peak || Spacewatch || — || align=right | 1.3 km || 
|-id=156 bgcolor=#fefefe
| 125156 ||  || — || October 16, 2001 || Palomar || NEAT || FLO || align=right | 1.2 km || 
|-id=157 bgcolor=#fefefe
| 125157 ||  || — || October 21, 2001 || Kitt Peak || Spacewatch || MAS || align=right | 1.2 km || 
|-id=158 bgcolor=#fefefe
| 125158 ||  || — || October 18, 2001 || Palomar || NEAT || — || align=right | 1.6 km || 
|-id=159 bgcolor=#C2FFFF
| 125159 ||  || — || October 19, 2001 || Haleakala || NEAT || L5 || align=right | 22 km || 
|-id=160 bgcolor=#fefefe
| 125160 ||  || — || October 19, 2001 || Haleakala || NEAT || KLI || align=right | 3.0 km || 
|-id=161 bgcolor=#fefefe
| 125161 ||  || — || October 19, 2001 || Palomar || NEAT || NYS || align=right | 1.5 km || 
|-id=162 bgcolor=#fefefe
| 125162 ||  || — || October 19, 2001 || Palomar || NEAT || — || align=right | 1.1 km || 
|-id=163 bgcolor=#fefefe
| 125163 ||  || — || October 19, 2001 || Palomar || NEAT || — || align=right | 1.5 km || 
|-id=164 bgcolor=#fefefe
| 125164 ||  || — || October 16, 2001 || Socorro || LINEAR || V || align=right data-sort-value="0.98" | 980 m || 
|-id=165 bgcolor=#fefefe
| 125165 ||  || — || October 17, 2001 || Socorro || LINEAR || NYS || align=right data-sort-value="0.95" | 950 m || 
|-id=166 bgcolor=#fefefe
| 125166 ||  || — || October 17, 2001 || Socorro || LINEAR || — || align=right | 1.2 km || 
|-id=167 bgcolor=#fefefe
| 125167 ||  || — || October 20, 2001 || Socorro || LINEAR || MAS || align=right | 1.5 km || 
|-id=168 bgcolor=#E9E9E9
| 125168 ||  || — || October 20, 2001 || Socorro || LINEAR || — || align=right | 2.2 km || 
|-id=169 bgcolor=#fefefe
| 125169 ||  || — || October 20, 2001 || Socorro || LINEAR || ERI || align=right | 4.0 km || 
|-id=170 bgcolor=#fefefe
| 125170 ||  || — || October 20, 2001 || Socorro || LINEAR || FLO || align=right | 1.2 km || 
|-id=171 bgcolor=#fefefe
| 125171 ||  || — || October 20, 2001 || Socorro || LINEAR || FLO || align=right | 1.6 km || 
|-id=172 bgcolor=#fefefe
| 125172 ||  || — || October 20, 2001 || Socorro || LINEAR || — || align=right | 1.3 km || 
|-id=173 bgcolor=#fefefe
| 125173 ||  || — || October 20, 2001 || Socorro || LINEAR || FLO || align=right | 1.1 km || 
|-id=174 bgcolor=#fefefe
| 125174 ||  || — || October 20, 2001 || Socorro || LINEAR || V || align=right | 1.3 km || 
|-id=175 bgcolor=#E9E9E9
| 125175 ||  || — || October 20, 2001 || Socorro || LINEAR || — || align=right | 3.7 km || 
|-id=176 bgcolor=#fefefe
| 125176 ||  || — || October 20, 2001 || Socorro || LINEAR || — || align=right | 1.5 km || 
|-id=177 bgcolor=#fefefe
| 125177 ||  || — || October 21, 2001 || Socorro || LINEAR || — || align=right | 1.3 km || 
|-id=178 bgcolor=#fefefe
| 125178 ||  || — || October 21, 2001 || Socorro || LINEAR || — || align=right | 1.3 km || 
|-id=179 bgcolor=#fefefe
| 125179 ||  || — || October 22, 2001 || Socorro || LINEAR || FLO || align=right | 1.5 km || 
|-id=180 bgcolor=#E9E9E9
| 125180 ||  || — || October 22, 2001 || Socorro || LINEAR || — || align=right | 3.2 km || 
|-id=181 bgcolor=#fefefe
| 125181 ||  || — || October 22, 2001 || Socorro || LINEAR || — || align=right | 1.7 km || 
|-id=182 bgcolor=#fefefe
| 125182 ||  || — || October 22, 2001 || Socorro || LINEAR || NYS || align=right | 2.2 km || 
|-id=183 bgcolor=#fefefe
| 125183 ||  || — || October 22, 2001 || Socorro || LINEAR || — || align=right | 3.3 km || 
|-id=184 bgcolor=#E9E9E9
| 125184 ||  || — || October 22, 2001 || Socorro || LINEAR || — || align=right | 2.4 km || 
|-id=185 bgcolor=#fefefe
| 125185 ||  || — || October 22, 2001 || Socorro || LINEAR || — || align=right | 1.4 km || 
|-id=186 bgcolor=#fefefe
| 125186 ||  || — || October 22, 2001 || Socorro || LINEAR || MAS || align=right | 1.6 km || 
|-id=187 bgcolor=#fefefe
| 125187 ||  || — || October 22, 2001 || Socorro || LINEAR || — || align=right | 1.3 km || 
|-id=188 bgcolor=#fefefe
| 125188 ||  || — || October 22, 2001 || Socorro || LINEAR || — || align=right | 1.1 km || 
|-id=189 bgcolor=#fefefe
| 125189 ||  || — || October 22, 2001 || Socorro || LINEAR || V || align=right | 1.3 km || 
|-id=190 bgcolor=#fefefe
| 125190 ||  || — || October 22, 2001 || Socorro || LINEAR || FLO || align=right | 1.4 km || 
|-id=191 bgcolor=#fefefe
| 125191 ||  || — || October 22, 2001 || Socorro || LINEAR || NYS || align=right | 1.1 km || 
|-id=192 bgcolor=#fefefe
| 125192 ||  || — || October 22, 2001 || Socorro || LINEAR || — || align=right | 1.5 km || 
|-id=193 bgcolor=#fefefe
| 125193 ||  || — || October 22, 2001 || Socorro || LINEAR || MAS || align=right | 1.8 km || 
|-id=194 bgcolor=#E9E9E9
| 125194 ||  || — || October 22, 2001 || Socorro || LINEAR || ADE || align=right | 4.1 km || 
|-id=195 bgcolor=#E9E9E9
| 125195 ||  || — || October 17, 2001 || Socorro || LINEAR || — || align=right | 2.1 km || 
|-id=196 bgcolor=#fefefe
| 125196 ||  || — || October 17, 2001 || Socorro || LINEAR || — || align=right | 2.1 km || 
|-id=197 bgcolor=#fefefe
| 125197 ||  || — || October 17, 2001 || Socorro || LINEAR || — || align=right | 3.6 km || 
|-id=198 bgcolor=#E9E9E9
| 125198 ||  || — || October 22, 2001 || Socorro || LINEAR || — || align=right | 4.8 km || 
|-id=199 bgcolor=#fefefe
| 125199 ||  || — || October 22, 2001 || Socorro || LINEAR || — || align=right | 3.9 km || 
|-id=200 bgcolor=#fefefe
| 125200 ||  || — || October 23, 2001 || Socorro || LINEAR || — || align=right | 1.4 km || 
|}

125201–125300 

|-bgcolor=#fefefe
| 125201 ||  || — || October 23, 2001 || Socorro || LINEAR || — || align=right | 1.5 km || 
|-id=202 bgcolor=#fefefe
| 125202 ||  || — || October 23, 2001 || Socorro || LINEAR || FLO || align=right data-sort-value="0.91" | 910 m || 
|-id=203 bgcolor=#fefefe
| 125203 ||  || — || October 23, 2001 || Socorro || LINEAR || FLO || align=right | 1.3 km || 
|-id=204 bgcolor=#E9E9E9
| 125204 ||  || — || October 23, 2001 || Socorro || LINEAR || KON || align=right | 4.4 km || 
|-id=205 bgcolor=#fefefe
| 125205 ||  || — || October 23, 2001 || Socorro || LINEAR || MAS || align=right | 1.2 km || 
|-id=206 bgcolor=#fefefe
| 125206 ||  || — || October 23, 2001 || Socorro || LINEAR || FLO || align=right | 1.2 km || 
|-id=207 bgcolor=#fefefe
| 125207 ||  || — || October 23, 2001 || Socorro || LINEAR || FLO || align=right | 1.8 km || 
|-id=208 bgcolor=#fefefe
| 125208 ||  || — || October 23, 2001 || Socorro || LINEAR || — || align=right | 1.3 km || 
|-id=209 bgcolor=#fefefe
| 125209 ||  || — || October 23, 2001 || Socorro || LINEAR || ERI || align=right | 4.1 km || 
|-id=210 bgcolor=#fefefe
| 125210 ||  || — || October 23, 2001 || Socorro || LINEAR || NYS || align=right | 1.2 km || 
|-id=211 bgcolor=#E9E9E9
| 125211 ||  || — || October 23, 2001 || Socorro || LINEAR || — || align=right | 2.1 km || 
|-id=212 bgcolor=#E9E9E9
| 125212 ||  || — || October 23, 2001 || Socorro || LINEAR || — || align=right | 2.0 km || 
|-id=213 bgcolor=#fefefe
| 125213 ||  || — || October 23, 2001 || Socorro || LINEAR || — || align=right | 3.8 km || 
|-id=214 bgcolor=#E9E9E9
| 125214 ||  || — || October 23, 2001 || Socorro || LINEAR || — || align=right | 2.1 km || 
|-id=215 bgcolor=#E9E9E9
| 125215 ||  || — || October 23, 2001 || Socorro || LINEAR || HEN || align=right | 2.3 km || 
|-id=216 bgcolor=#E9E9E9
| 125216 ||  || — || October 23, 2001 || Socorro || LINEAR || — || align=right | 1.9 km || 
|-id=217 bgcolor=#fefefe
| 125217 ||  || — || October 23, 2001 || Socorro || LINEAR || — || align=right | 1.5 km || 
|-id=218 bgcolor=#fefefe
| 125218 ||  || — || October 23, 2001 || Socorro || LINEAR || NYS || align=right | 1.3 km || 
|-id=219 bgcolor=#fefefe
| 125219 ||  || — || October 23, 2001 || Socorro || LINEAR || V || align=right | 1.5 km || 
|-id=220 bgcolor=#fefefe
| 125220 ||  || — || October 23, 2001 || Socorro || LINEAR || — || align=right | 1.8 km || 
|-id=221 bgcolor=#fefefe
| 125221 ||  || — || October 23, 2001 || Socorro || LINEAR || — || align=right | 1.8 km || 
|-id=222 bgcolor=#E9E9E9
| 125222 ||  || — || October 23, 2001 || Socorro || LINEAR || — || align=right | 1.6 km || 
|-id=223 bgcolor=#fefefe
| 125223 ||  || — || October 23, 2001 || Socorro || LINEAR || — || align=right | 1.5 km || 
|-id=224 bgcolor=#E9E9E9
| 125224 ||  || — || October 23, 2001 || Socorro || LINEAR || — || align=right | 1.7 km || 
|-id=225 bgcolor=#E9E9E9
| 125225 ||  || — || October 23, 2001 || Socorro || LINEAR || — || align=right | 1.7 km || 
|-id=226 bgcolor=#fefefe
| 125226 ||  || — || October 23, 2001 || Socorro || LINEAR || MAS || align=right | 1.3 km || 
|-id=227 bgcolor=#fefefe
| 125227 ||  || — || October 23, 2001 || Socorro || LINEAR || — || align=right | 4.2 km || 
|-id=228 bgcolor=#E9E9E9
| 125228 ||  || — || October 23, 2001 || Socorro || LINEAR || — || align=right | 1.5 km || 
|-id=229 bgcolor=#fefefe
| 125229 ||  || — || October 23, 2001 || Socorro || LINEAR || FLO || align=right | 2.0 km || 
|-id=230 bgcolor=#fefefe
| 125230 ||  || — || October 23, 2001 || Socorro || LINEAR || — || align=right | 1.9 km || 
|-id=231 bgcolor=#fefefe
| 125231 ||  || — || October 23, 2001 || Socorro || LINEAR || V || align=right | 1.2 km || 
|-id=232 bgcolor=#fefefe
| 125232 ||  || — || October 23, 2001 || Socorro || LINEAR || — || align=right | 1.6 km || 
|-id=233 bgcolor=#fefefe
| 125233 ||  || — || October 23, 2001 || Socorro || LINEAR || V || align=right | 1.1 km || 
|-id=234 bgcolor=#fefefe
| 125234 ||  || — || October 23, 2001 || Socorro || LINEAR || — || align=right | 1.7 km || 
|-id=235 bgcolor=#fefefe
| 125235 ||  || — || October 23, 2001 || Socorro || LINEAR || — || align=right | 3.3 km || 
|-id=236 bgcolor=#fefefe
| 125236 ||  || — || October 23, 2001 || Socorro || LINEAR || FLO || align=right | 1.0 km || 
|-id=237 bgcolor=#fefefe
| 125237 ||  || — || October 19, 2001 || Haleakala || NEAT || V || align=right | 1.4 km || 
|-id=238 bgcolor=#fefefe
| 125238 ||  || — || October 21, 2001 || Socorro || LINEAR || — || align=right | 1.3 km || 
|-id=239 bgcolor=#fefefe
| 125239 ||  || — || October 21, 2001 || Socorro || LINEAR || — || align=right | 1.7 km || 
|-id=240 bgcolor=#fefefe
| 125240 ||  || — || October 24, 2001 || Socorro || LINEAR || FLO || align=right | 1.2 km || 
|-id=241 bgcolor=#fefefe
| 125241 ||  || — || October 18, 2001 || Palomar || NEAT || — || align=right | 1.4 km || 
|-id=242 bgcolor=#fefefe
| 125242 ||  || — || October 18, 2001 || Palomar || NEAT || V || align=right | 1.2 km || 
|-id=243 bgcolor=#fefefe
| 125243 ||  || — || October 18, 2001 || Palomar || NEAT || — || align=right | 3.5 km || 
|-id=244 bgcolor=#E9E9E9
| 125244 ||  || — || October 19, 2001 || Palomar || NEAT || — || align=right | 2.0 km || 
|-id=245 bgcolor=#E9E9E9
| 125245 ||  || — || October 23, 2001 || Haleakala || NEAT || — || align=right | 4.1 km || 
|-id=246 bgcolor=#fefefe
| 125246 ||  || — || October 24, 2001 || Palomar || NEAT || — || align=right | 2.1 km || 
|-id=247 bgcolor=#fefefe
| 125247 ||  || — || October 25, 2001 || Kitt Peak || Spacewatch || ERI || align=right | 3.3 km || 
|-id=248 bgcolor=#fefefe
| 125248 ||  || — || October 26, 2001 || Palomar || NEAT || — || align=right data-sort-value="0.98" | 980 m || 
|-id=249 bgcolor=#fefefe
| 125249 ||  || — || October 18, 2001 || Kitt Peak || Spacewatch || — || align=right | 1.2 km || 
|-id=250 bgcolor=#fefefe
| 125250 ||  || — || October 19, 2001 || Palomar || NEAT || — || align=right | 1.4 km || 
|-id=251 bgcolor=#fefefe
| 125251 ||  || — || October 19, 2001 || Palomar || NEAT || — || align=right | 1.2 km || 
|-id=252 bgcolor=#fefefe
| 125252 ||  || — || October 19, 2001 || Palomar || NEAT || — || align=right | 1.4 km || 
|-id=253 bgcolor=#fefefe
| 125253 ||  || — || October 19, 2001 || Palomar || NEAT || — || align=right | 1.3 km || 
|-id=254 bgcolor=#E9E9E9
| 125254 ||  || — || October 19, 2001 || Palomar || NEAT || — || align=right | 2.8 km || 
|-id=255 bgcolor=#fefefe
| 125255 ||  || — || October 23, 2001 || Kitt Peak || Spacewatch || — || align=right | 1.9 km || 
|-id=256 bgcolor=#E9E9E9
| 125256 ||  || — || October 24, 2001 || Socorro || LINEAR || — || align=right | 1.5 km || 
|-id=257 bgcolor=#fefefe
| 125257 ||  || — || October 26, 2001 || Palomar || NEAT || — || align=right | 1.5 km || 
|-id=258 bgcolor=#fefefe
| 125258 ||  || — || October 26, 2001 || Palomar || NEAT || NYS || align=right | 1.4 km || 
|-id=259 bgcolor=#fefefe
| 125259 ||  || — || October 17, 2001 || Socorro || LINEAR || — || align=right | 1.5 km || 
|-id=260 bgcolor=#fefefe
| 125260 ||  || — || October 21, 2001 || Socorro || LINEAR || — || align=right | 1.2 km || 
|-id=261 bgcolor=#fefefe
| 125261 ||  || — || October 21, 2001 || Socorro || LINEAR || FLO || align=right data-sort-value="0.98" | 980 m || 
|-id=262 bgcolor=#fefefe
| 125262 ||  || — || October 21, 2001 || Socorro || LINEAR || — || align=right | 1.6 km || 
|-id=263 bgcolor=#fefefe
| 125263 ||  || — || October 24, 2001 || Socorro || LINEAR || NYS || align=right | 1.3 km || 
|-id=264 bgcolor=#fefefe
| 125264 ||  || — || October 24, 2001 || Socorro || LINEAR || — || align=right | 1.3 km || 
|-id=265 bgcolor=#E9E9E9
| 125265 ||  || — || October 23, 2001 || Kvistaberg || UDAS || — || align=right | 2.7 km || 
|-id=266 bgcolor=#fefefe
| 125266 || 2001 VG || — || November 7, 2001 || Emerald Lane || L. Ball || FLO || align=right data-sort-value="0.85" | 850 m || 
|-id=267 bgcolor=#fefefe
| 125267 ||  || — || November 9, 2001 || Palomar || NEAT || NYS || align=right | 1.1 km || 
|-id=268 bgcolor=#fefefe
| 125268 ||  || — || November 10, 2001 || Badlands || R. Dyvig || FLO || align=right | 1.5 km || 
|-id=269 bgcolor=#fefefe
| 125269 ||  || — || November 11, 2001 || Kitt Peak || Spacewatch || — || align=right | 1.4 km || 
|-id=270 bgcolor=#fefefe
| 125270 ||  || — || November 11, 2001 || Kitt Peak || Spacewatch || V || align=right | 1.1 km || 
|-id=271 bgcolor=#fefefe
| 125271 ||  || — || November 9, 2001 || Socorro || LINEAR || NYS || align=right data-sort-value="0.89" | 890 m || 
|-id=272 bgcolor=#fefefe
| 125272 ||  || — || November 9, 2001 || Socorro || LINEAR || MAS || align=right | 1.0 km || 
|-id=273 bgcolor=#fefefe
| 125273 ||  || — || November 9, 2001 || Socorro || LINEAR || V || align=right | 1.3 km || 
|-id=274 bgcolor=#E9E9E9
| 125274 ||  || — || November 10, 2001 || Socorro || LINEAR || — || align=right | 2.1 km || 
|-id=275 bgcolor=#E9E9E9
| 125275 ||  || — || November 10, 2001 || Socorro || LINEAR || — || align=right | 8.9 km || 
|-id=276 bgcolor=#fefefe
| 125276 ||  || — || November 10, 2001 || Socorro || LINEAR || — || align=right | 5.1 km || 
|-id=277 bgcolor=#fefefe
| 125277 ||  || — || November 10, 2001 || Socorro || LINEAR || — || align=right | 1.7 km || 
|-id=278 bgcolor=#fefefe
| 125278 ||  || — || November 10, 2001 || Socorro || LINEAR || — || align=right | 1.5 km || 
|-id=279 bgcolor=#fefefe
| 125279 ||  || — || November 10, 2001 || Socorro || LINEAR || — || align=right | 2.0 km || 
|-id=280 bgcolor=#E9E9E9
| 125280 ||  || — || November 10, 2001 || Socorro || LINEAR || — || align=right | 2.4 km || 
|-id=281 bgcolor=#fefefe
| 125281 ||  || — || November 10, 2001 || Socorro || LINEAR || — || align=right | 1.8 km || 
|-id=282 bgcolor=#fefefe
| 125282 ||  || — || November 10, 2001 || Socorro || LINEAR || V || align=right | 1.3 km || 
|-id=283 bgcolor=#fefefe
| 125283 ||  || — || November 9, 2001 || Socorro || LINEAR || MAS || align=right | 1.2 km || 
|-id=284 bgcolor=#E9E9E9
| 125284 ||  || — || November 9, 2001 || Socorro || LINEAR || — || align=right | 1.4 km || 
|-id=285 bgcolor=#fefefe
| 125285 ||  || — || November 9, 2001 || Socorro || LINEAR || — || align=right | 1.1 km || 
|-id=286 bgcolor=#d6d6d6
| 125286 ||  || — || November 9, 2001 || Socorro || LINEAR || 3:2 || align=right | 8.4 km || 
|-id=287 bgcolor=#fefefe
| 125287 ||  || — || November 9, 2001 || Socorro || LINEAR || FLO || align=right | 1.8 km || 
|-id=288 bgcolor=#fefefe
| 125288 ||  || — || November 9, 2001 || Socorro || LINEAR || — || align=right | 2.0 km || 
|-id=289 bgcolor=#E9E9E9
| 125289 ||  || — || November 9, 2001 || Socorro || LINEAR || — || align=right | 2.4 km || 
|-id=290 bgcolor=#fefefe
| 125290 ||  || — || November 9, 2001 || Socorro || LINEAR || MAS || align=right | 1.5 km || 
|-id=291 bgcolor=#fefefe
| 125291 ||  || — || November 9, 2001 || Socorro || LINEAR || FLO || align=right | 1.2 km || 
|-id=292 bgcolor=#fefefe
| 125292 ||  || — || November 9, 2001 || Socorro || LINEAR || NYS || align=right | 1.2 km || 
|-id=293 bgcolor=#E9E9E9
| 125293 ||  || — || November 9, 2001 || Socorro || LINEAR || — || align=right | 2.8 km || 
|-id=294 bgcolor=#fefefe
| 125294 ||  || — || November 9, 2001 || Socorro || LINEAR || — || align=right | 1.7 km || 
|-id=295 bgcolor=#fefefe
| 125295 ||  || — || November 9, 2001 || Socorro || LINEAR || — || align=right | 1.9 km || 
|-id=296 bgcolor=#fefefe
| 125296 ||  || — || November 9, 2001 || Socorro || LINEAR || — || align=right | 1.5 km || 
|-id=297 bgcolor=#fefefe
| 125297 ||  || — || November 9, 2001 || Socorro || LINEAR || NYS || align=right | 4.0 km || 
|-id=298 bgcolor=#fefefe
| 125298 ||  || — || November 9, 2001 || Socorro || LINEAR || — || align=right | 4.0 km || 
|-id=299 bgcolor=#fefefe
| 125299 ||  || — || November 9, 2001 || Socorro || LINEAR || MAS || align=right | 1.3 km || 
|-id=300 bgcolor=#fefefe
| 125300 ||  || — || November 9, 2001 || Socorro || LINEAR || — || align=right | 2.2 km || 
|}

125301–125400 

|-bgcolor=#fefefe
| 125301 ||  || — || November 9, 2001 || Socorro || LINEAR || — || align=right | 1.5 km || 
|-id=302 bgcolor=#fefefe
| 125302 ||  || — || November 9, 2001 || Socorro || LINEAR || FLO || align=right | 1.4 km || 
|-id=303 bgcolor=#fefefe
| 125303 ||  || — || November 9, 2001 || Socorro || LINEAR || — || align=right | 1.7 km || 
|-id=304 bgcolor=#fefefe
| 125304 ||  || — || November 9, 2001 || Socorro || LINEAR || V || align=right | 2.1 km || 
|-id=305 bgcolor=#fefefe
| 125305 ||  || — || November 9, 2001 || Socorro || LINEAR || — || align=right | 3.2 km || 
|-id=306 bgcolor=#E9E9E9
| 125306 ||  || — || November 9, 2001 || Socorro || LINEAR || — || align=right | 2.0 km || 
|-id=307 bgcolor=#fefefe
| 125307 ||  || — || November 9, 2001 || Socorro || LINEAR || — || align=right | 2.0 km || 
|-id=308 bgcolor=#fefefe
| 125308 ||  || — || November 9, 2001 || Socorro || LINEAR || — || align=right | 3.6 km || 
|-id=309 bgcolor=#fefefe
| 125309 ||  || — || November 9, 2001 || Socorro || LINEAR || NYS || align=right | 4.3 km || 
|-id=310 bgcolor=#fefefe
| 125310 ||  || — || November 9, 2001 || Socorro || LINEAR || NYS || align=right | 2.2 km || 
|-id=311 bgcolor=#fefefe
| 125311 ||  || — || November 9, 2001 || Socorro || LINEAR || — || align=right | 1.9 km || 
|-id=312 bgcolor=#E9E9E9
| 125312 ||  || — || November 9, 2001 || Socorro || LINEAR || — || align=right | 2.0 km || 
|-id=313 bgcolor=#fefefe
| 125313 ||  || — || November 9, 2001 || Socorro || LINEAR || V || align=right | 1.2 km || 
|-id=314 bgcolor=#fefefe
| 125314 ||  || — || November 9, 2001 || Socorro || LINEAR || NYS || align=right | 1.5 km || 
|-id=315 bgcolor=#fefefe
| 125315 ||  || — || November 9, 2001 || Socorro || LINEAR || NYS || align=right data-sort-value="0.87" | 870 m || 
|-id=316 bgcolor=#fefefe
| 125316 ||  || — || November 9, 2001 || Socorro || LINEAR || — || align=right | 1.8 km || 
|-id=317 bgcolor=#fefefe
| 125317 ||  || — || November 9, 2001 || Socorro || LINEAR || FLO || align=right | 1.2 km || 
|-id=318 bgcolor=#fefefe
| 125318 ||  || — || November 9, 2001 || Socorro || LINEAR || — || align=right | 3.2 km || 
|-id=319 bgcolor=#fefefe
| 125319 ||  || — || November 9, 2001 || Socorro || LINEAR || — || align=right | 1.4 km || 
|-id=320 bgcolor=#fefefe
| 125320 ||  || — || November 9, 2001 || Socorro || LINEAR || — || align=right | 1.4 km || 
|-id=321 bgcolor=#fefefe
| 125321 ||  || — || November 9, 2001 || Socorro || LINEAR || — || align=right | 1.3 km || 
|-id=322 bgcolor=#fefefe
| 125322 ||  || — || November 9, 2001 || Socorro || LINEAR || MAS || align=right | 1.4 km || 
|-id=323 bgcolor=#fefefe
| 125323 ||  || — || November 9, 2001 || Socorro || LINEAR || — || align=right | 2.0 km || 
|-id=324 bgcolor=#E9E9E9
| 125324 ||  || — || November 9, 2001 || Socorro || LINEAR || — || align=right | 2.7 km || 
|-id=325 bgcolor=#fefefe
| 125325 ||  || — || November 9, 2001 || Socorro || LINEAR || MAS || align=right | 1.6 km || 
|-id=326 bgcolor=#fefefe
| 125326 ||  || — || November 9, 2001 || Socorro || LINEAR || MAS || align=right | 1.5 km || 
|-id=327 bgcolor=#E9E9E9
| 125327 ||  || — || November 9, 2001 || Socorro || LINEAR || — || align=right | 2.0 km || 
|-id=328 bgcolor=#E9E9E9
| 125328 ||  || — || November 9, 2001 || Socorro || LINEAR || EUN || align=right | 2.8 km || 
|-id=329 bgcolor=#fefefe
| 125329 ||  || — || November 9, 2001 || Socorro || LINEAR || NYS || align=right | 1.4 km || 
|-id=330 bgcolor=#E9E9E9
| 125330 ||  || — || November 9, 2001 || Socorro || LINEAR || — || align=right | 2.8 km || 
|-id=331 bgcolor=#fefefe
| 125331 ||  || — || November 9, 2001 || Socorro || LINEAR || NYS || align=right | 1.4 km || 
|-id=332 bgcolor=#E9E9E9
| 125332 ||  || — || November 9, 2001 || Socorro || LINEAR || MAR || align=right | 2.4 km || 
|-id=333 bgcolor=#E9E9E9
| 125333 ||  || — || November 9, 2001 || Socorro || LINEAR || — || align=right | 2.9 km || 
|-id=334 bgcolor=#fefefe
| 125334 ||  || — || November 9, 2001 || Socorro || LINEAR || — || align=right | 2.9 km || 
|-id=335 bgcolor=#fefefe
| 125335 ||  || — || November 9, 2001 || Socorro || LINEAR || NYS || align=right | 1.5 km || 
|-id=336 bgcolor=#E9E9E9
| 125336 ||  || — || November 9, 2001 || Socorro || LINEAR || — || align=right | 3.4 km || 
|-id=337 bgcolor=#fefefe
| 125337 ||  || — || November 10, 2001 || Socorro || LINEAR || — || align=right | 2.2 km || 
|-id=338 bgcolor=#fefefe
| 125338 ||  || — || November 10, 2001 || Socorro || LINEAR || — || align=right | 2.0 km || 
|-id=339 bgcolor=#fefefe
| 125339 ||  || — || November 10, 2001 || Socorro || LINEAR || V || align=right | 1.2 km || 
|-id=340 bgcolor=#fefefe
| 125340 ||  || — || November 10, 2001 || Socorro || LINEAR || V || align=right | 1.9 km || 
|-id=341 bgcolor=#fefefe
| 125341 ||  || — || November 10, 2001 || Socorro || LINEAR || — || align=right | 1.3 km || 
|-id=342 bgcolor=#fefefe
| 125342 ||  || — || November 10, 2001 || Socorro || LINEAR || V || align=right | 1.4 km || 
|-id=343 bgcolor=#fefefe
| 125343 ||  || — || November 10, 2001 || Socorro || LINEAR || FLO || align=right | 1.2 km || 
|-id=344 bgcolor=#fefefe
| 125344 ||  || — || November 10, 2001 || Socorro || LINEAR || — || align=right | 1.4 km || 
|-id=345 bgcolor=#fefefe
| 125345 ||  || — || November 10, 2001 || Socorro || LINEAR || — || align=right | 2.8 km || 
|-id=346 bgcolor=#fefefe
| 125346 ||  || — || November 10, 2001 || Socorro || LINEAR || — || align=right | 1.8 km || 
|-id=347 bgcolor=#fefefe
| 125347 ||  || — || November 10, 2001 || Socorro || LINEAR || FLO || align=right | 1.3 km || 
|-id=348 bgcolor=#fefefe
| 125348 ||  || — || November 10, 2001 || Socorro || LINEAR || — || align=right | 1.6 km || 
|-id=349 bgcolor=#fefefe
| 125349 ||  || — || November 10, 2001 || Socorro || LINEAR || V || align=right | 1.5 km || 
|-id=350 bgcolor=#fefefe
| 125350 ||  || — || November 10, 2001 || Socorro || LINEAR || V || align=right | 1.6 km || 
|-id=351 bgcolor=#fefefe
| 125351 ||  || — || November 10, 2001 || Socorro || LINEAR || FLO || align=right | 1.0 km || 
|-id=352 bgcolor=#fefefe
| 125352 ||  || — || November 10, 2001 || Socorro || LINEAR || FLO || align=right data-sort-value="0.89" | 890 m || 
|-id=353 bgcolor=#fefefe
| 125353 ||  || — || November 10, 2001 || Socorro || LINEAR || — || align=right | 2.1 km || 
|-id=354 bgcolor=#fefefe
| 125354 ||  || — || November 10, 2001 || Socorro || LINEAR || FLO || align=right | 1.0 km || 
|-id=355 bgcolor=#fefefe
| 125355 ||  || — || November 10, 2001 || Socorro || LINEAR || — || align=right | 1.8 km || 
|-id=356 bgcolor=#fefefe
| 125356 ||  || — || November 10, 2001 || Socorro || LINEAR || — || align=right | 1.6 km || 
|-id=357 bgcolor=#fefefe
| 125357 ||  || — || November 10, 2001 || Socorro || LINEAR || — || align=right | 1.3 km || 
|-id=358 bgcolor=#fefefe
| 125358 ||  || — || November 10, 2001 || Socorro || LINEAR || — || align=right | 1.7 km || 
|-id=359 bgcolor=#fefefe
| 125359 ||  || — || November 10, 2001 || Socorro || LINEAR || — || align=right | 1.7 km || 
|-id=360 bgcolor=#fefefe
| 125360 ||  || — || November 10, 2001 || Socorro || LINEAR || FLO || align=right | 1.2 km || 
|-id=361 bgcolor=#fefefe
| 125361 ||  || — || November 10, 2001 || Socorro || LINEAR || NYS || align=right | 2.7 km || 
|-id=362 bgcolor=#fefefe
| 125362 ||  || — || November 10, 2001 || Socorro || LINEAR || — || align=right | 1.6 km || 
|-id=363 bgcolor=#E9E9E9
| 125363 ||  || — || November 10, 2001 || Socorro || LINEAR || — || align=right | 1.9 km || 
|-id=364 bgcolor=#E9E9E9
| 125364 ||  || — || November 11, 2001 || Socorro || LINEAR || — || align=right | 4.5 km || 
|-id=365 bgcolor=#d6d6d6
| 125365 ||  || — || November 11, 2001 || Socorro || LINEAR || THM || align=right | 5.3 km || 
|-id=366 bgcolor=#fefefe
| 125366 ||  || — || November 11, 2001 || Socorro || LINEAR || — || align=right data-sort-value="0.98" | 980 m || 
|-id=367 bgcolor=#fefefe
| 125367 ||  || — || November 11, 2001 || Socorro || LINEAR || FLO || align=right | 1.1 km || 
|-id=368 bgcolor=#E9E9E9
| 125368 ||  || — || November 11, 2001 || Socorro || LINEAR || — || align=right | 7.1 km || 
|-id=369 bgcolor=#E9E9E9
| 125369 ||  || — || November 11, 2001 || Socorro || LINEAR || — || align=right | 5.1 km || 
|-id=370 bgcolor=#E9E9E9
| 125370 ||  || — || November 10, 2001 || Bisei SG Center || BATTeRS || — || align=right | 2.6 km || 
|-id=371 bgcolor=#fefefe
| 125371 ||  || — || November 14, 2001 || Ondřejov || P. Kušnirák, P. Pravec || V || align=right | 1.9 km || 
|-id=372 bgcolor=#fefefe
| 125372 ||  || — || November 15, 2001 || Modra || L. Kornoš, J. Tóth || — || align=right | 1.7 km || 
|-id=373 bgcolor=#fefefe
| 125373 ||  || — || November 14, 2001 || Kitt Peak || Spacewatch || V || align=right | 1.2 km || 
|-id=374 bgcolor=#fefefe
| 125374 ||  || — || November 8, 2001 || Palomar || NEAT || — || align=right | 1.8 km || 
|-id=375 bgcolor=#E9E9E9
| 125375 ||  || — || November 9, 2001 || Palomar || NEAT || — || align=right | 4.3 km || 
|-id=376 bgcolor=#fefefe
| 125376 ||  || — || November 12, 2001 || Haleakala || NEAT || LCI || align=right | 2.1 km || 
|-id=377 bgcolor=#fefefe
| 125377 ||  || — || November 9, 2001 || Palomar || NEAT || — || align=right | 1.3 km || 
|-id=378 bgcolor=#E9E9E9
| 125378 ||  || — || November 9, 2001 || Palomar || NEAT || — || align=right | 2.0 km || 
|-id=379 bgcolor=#E9E9E9
| 125379 ||  || — || November 9, 2001 || Palomar || NEAT || — || align=right | 2.0 km || 
|-id=380 bgcolor=#fefefe
| 125380 ||  || — || November 9, 2001 || Palomar || NEAT || — || align=right | 1.7 km || 
|-id=381 bgcolor=#fefefe
| 125381 ||  || — || November 9, 2001 || Palomar || NEAT || — || align=right | 1.1 km || 
|-id=382 bgcolor=#E9E9E9
| 125382 ||  || — || November 9, 2001 || Palomar || NEAT || — || align=right | 5.3 km || 
|-id=383 bgcolor=#fefefe
| 125383 ||  || — || November 10, 2001 || Palomar || NEAT || — || align=right | 2.3 km || 
|-id=384 bgcolor=#fefefe
| 125384 ||  || — || November 10, 2001 || Palomar || NEAT || — || align=right | 1.7 km || 
|-id=385 bgcolor=#fefefe
| 125385 ||  || — || November 10, 2001 || Socorro || LINEAR || — || align=right | 1.5 km || 
|-id=386 bgcolor=#fefefe
| 125386 ||  || — || November 10, 2001 || Socorro || LINEAR || — || align=right | 2.0 km || 
|-id=387 bgcolor=#fefefe
| 125387 ||  || — || November 10, 2001 || Socorro || LINEAR || NYS || align=right | 3.6 km || 
|-id=388 bgcolor=#E9E9E9
| 125388 ||  || — || November 11, 2001 || Socorro || LINEAR || — || align=right | 3.8 km || 
|-id=389 bgcolor=#E9E9E9
| 125389 ||  || — || November 11, 2001 || Socorro || LINEAR || — || align=right | 3.2 km || 
|-id=390 bgcolor=#fefefe
| 125390 ||  || — || November 12, 2001 || Socorro || LINEAR || V || align=right | 1.3 km || 
|-id=391 bgcolor=#fefefe
| 125391 ||  || — || November 12, 2001 || Haleakala || NEAT || — || align=right | 2.7 km || 
|-id=392 bgcolor=#fefefe
| 125392 ||  || — || November 15, 2001 || Socorro || LINEAR || KLI || align=right | 2.7 km || 
|-id=393 bgcolor=#fefefe
| 125393 ||  || — || November 15, 2001 || Socorro || LINEAR || — || align=right | 3.3 km || 
|-id=394 bgcolor=#E9E9E9
| 125394 ||  || — || November 15, 2001 || Socorro || LINEAR || — || align=right | 2.1 km || 
|-id=395 bgcolor=#E9E9E9
| 125395 ||  || — || November 15, 2001 || Socorro || LINEAR || — || align=right | 3.4 km || 
|-id=396 bgcolor=#E9E9E9
| 125396 ||  || — || November 15, 2001 || Socorro || LINEAR || MAR || align=right | 3.9 km || 
|-id=397 bgcolor=#E9E9E9
| 125397 ||  || — || November 15, 2001 || Socorro || LINEAR || EUN || align=right | 3.2 km || 
|-id=398 bgcolor=#E9E9E9
| 125398 ||  || — || November 15, 2001 || Socorro || LINEAR || ADE || align=right | 3.3 km || 
|-id=399 bgcolor=#fefefe
| 125399 ||  || — || November 12, 2001 || Socorro || LINEAR || ERI || align=right | 3.7 km || 
|-id=400 bgcolor=#fefefe
| 125400 ||  || — || November 12, 2001 || Socorro || LINEAR || V || align=right | 1.0 km || 
|}

125401–125500 

|-bgcolor=#fefefe
| 125401 ||  || — || November 12, 2001 || Socorro || LINEAR || — || align=right | 1.8 km || 
|-id=402 bgcolor=#fefefe
| 125402 ||  || — || November 12, 2001 || Socorro || LINEAR || V || align=right | 1.1 km || 
|-id=403 bgcolor=#fefefe
| 125403 ||  || — || November 12, 2001 || Socorro || LINEAR || FLO || align=right | 1.2 km || 
|-id=404 bgcolor=#fefefe
| 125404 ||  || — || November 12, 2001 || Socorro || LINEAR || NYS || align=right | 1.7 km || 
|-id=405 bgcolor=#fefefe
| 125405 ||  || — || November 12, 2001 || Socorro || LINEAR || NYS || align=right | 1.1 km || 
|-id=406 bgcolor=#fefefe
| 125406 ||  || — || November 12, 2001 || Socorro || LINEAR || — || align=right | 1.1 km || 
|-id=407 bgcolor=#fefefe
| 125407 ||  || — || November 12, 2001 || Socorro || LINEAR || — || align=right | 1.8 km || 
|-id=408 bgcolor=#fefefe
| 125408 ||  || — || November 12, 2001 || Socorro || LINEAR || — || align=right | 1.6 km || 
|-id=409 bgcolor=#fefefe
| 125409 ||  || — || November 12, 2001 || Socorro || LINEAR || FLO || align=right | 1.4 km || 
|-id=410 bgcolor=#fefefe
| 125410 ||  || — || November 12, 2001 || Socorro || LINEAR || FLO || align=right | 1.3 km || 
|-id=411 bgcolor=#fefefe
| 125411 ||  || — || November 12, 2001 || Socorro || LINEAR || V || align=right | 1.2 km || 
|-id=412 bgcolor=#E9E9E9
| 125412 ||  || — || November 12, 2001 || Socorro || LINEAR || — || align=right | 2.2 km || 
|-id=413 bgcolor=#fefefe
| 125413 ||  || — || November 12, 2001 || Socorro || LINEAR || NYS || align=right data-sort-value="0.96" | 960 m || 
|-id=414 bgcolor=#fefefe
| 125414 ||  || — || November 12, 2001 || Socorro || LINEAR || — || align=right | 1.4 km || 
|-id=415 bgcolor=#fefefe
| 125415 ||  || — || November 12, 2001 || Socorro || LINEAR || — || align=right | 1.6 km || 
|-id=416 bgcolor=#fefefe
| 125416 ||  || — || November 12, 2001 || Socorro || LINEAR || — || align=right | 1.4 km || 
|-id=417 bgcolor=#fefefe
| 125417 ||  || — || November 12, 2001 || Socorro || LINEAR || — || align=right | 1.4 km || 
|-id=418 bgcolor=#fefefe
| 125418 ||  || — || November 12, 2001 || Socorro || LINEAR || — || align=right | 1.9 km || 
|-id=419 bgcolor=#fefefe
| 125419 ||  || — || November 12, 2001 || Socorro || LINEAR || NYS || align=right | 2.1 km || 
|-id=420 bgcolor=#E9E9E9
| 125420 ||  || — || November 12, 2001 || Socorro || LINEAR || — || align=right | 2.1 km || 
|-id=421 bgcolor=#E9E9E9
| 125421 ||  || — || November 12, 2001 || Socorro || LINEAR || — || align=right | 1.6 km || 
|-id=422 bgcolor=#fefefe
| 125422 ||  || — || November 12, 2001 || Socorro || LINEAR || — || align=right | 2.0 km || 
|-id=423 bgcolor=#fefefe
| 125423 ||  || — || November 12, 2001 || Socorro || LINEAR || — || align=right | 1.6 km || 
|-id=424 bgcolor=#fefefe
| 125424 ||  || — || November 12, 2001 || Socorro || LINEAR || — || align=right | 2.0 km || 
|-id=425 bgcolor=#fefefe
| 125425 ||  || — || November 12, 2001 || Socorro || LINEAR || NYS || align=right | 3.1 km || 
|-id=426 bgcolor=#fefefe
| 125426 ||  || — || November 12, 2001 || Socorro || LINEAR || FLO || align=right | 1.2 km || 
|-id=427 bgcolor=#d6d6d6
| 125427 ||  || — || November 12, 2001 || Socorro || LINEAR || — || align=right | 4.7 km || 
|-id=428 bgcolor=#fefefe
| 125428 ||  || — || November 12, 2001 || Socorro || LINEAR || — || align=right | 1.5 km || 
|-id=429 bgcolor=#fefefe
| 125429 ||  || — || November 12, 2001 || Socorro || LINEAR || — || align=right | 1.5 km || 
|-id=430 bgcolor=#E9E9E9
| 125430 ||  || — || November 12, 2001 || Socorro || LINEAR || — || align=right | 1.8 km || 
|-id=431 bgcolor=#fefefe
| 125431 ||  || — || November 12, 2001 || Socorro || LINEAR || V || align=right | 1.5 km || 
|-id=432 bgcolor=#fefefe
| 125432 ||  || — || November 12, 2001 || Socorro || LINEAR || — || align=right | 1.8 km || 
|-id=433 bgcolor=#E9E9E9
| 125433 ||  || — || November 12, 2001 || Socorro || LINEAR || — || align=right | 3.7 km || 
|-id=434 bgcolor=#E9E9E9
| 125434 ||  || — || November 12, 2001 || Socorro || LINEAR || — || align=right | 1.5 km || 
|-id=435 bgcolor=#E9E9E9
| 125435 ||  || — || November 12, 2001 || Socorro || LINEAR || — || align=right | 1.8 km || 
|-id=436 bgcolor=#fefefe
| 125436 ||  || — || November 12, 2001 || Socorro || LINEAR || — || align=right | 1.8 km || 
|-id=437 bgcolor=#fefefe
| 125437 ||  || — || November 12, 2001 || Socorro || LINEAR || — || align=right | 1.6 km || 
|-id=438 bgcolor=#fefefe
| 125438 ||  || — || November 12, 2001 || Socorro || LINEAR || NYS || align=right | 1.1 km || 
|-id=439 bgcolor=#E9E9E9
| 125439 ||  || — || November 12, 2001 || Socorro || LINEAR || — || align=right | 2.6 km || 
|-id=440 bgcolor=#fefefe
| 125440 ||  || — || November 12, 2001 || Socorro || LINEAR || NYS || align=right | 1.4 km || 
|-id=441 bgcolor=#fefefe
| 125441 ||  || — || November 12, 2001 || Socorro || LINEAR || — || align=right | 2.0 km || 
|-id=442 bgcolor=#fefefe
| 125442 ||  || — || November 12, 2001 || Socorro || LINEAR || NYS || align=right | 1.6 km || 
|-id=443 bgcolor=#E9E9E9
| 125443 ||  || — || November 12, 2001 || Socorro || LINEAR || — || align=right | 2.9 km || 
|-id=444 bgcolor=#E9E9E9
| 125444 ||  || — || November 12, 2001 || Socorro || LINEAR || — || align=right | 2.7 km || 
|-id=445 bgcolor=#fefefe
| 125445 ||  || — || November 12, 2001 || Socorro || LINEAR || V || align=right | 1.5 km || 
|-id=446 bgcolor=#fefefe
| 125446 ||  || — || November 15, 2001 || Palomar || NEAT || V || align=right | 1.3 km || 
|-id=447 bgcolor=#fefefe
| 125447 ||  || — || November 15, 2001 || Palomar || NEAT || — || align=right | 2.0 km || 
|-id=448 bgcolor=#fefefe
| 125448 ||  || — || November 13, 2001 || Haleakala || NEAT || — || align=right | 2.6 km || 
|-id=449 bgcolor=#E9E9E9
| 125449 ||  || — || November 11, 2001 || Anderson Mesa || LONEOS || — || align=right | 4.3 km || 
|-id=450 bgcolor=#fefefe
| 125450 ||  || — || November 9, 2001 || Socorro || LINEAR || — || align=right | 1.1 km || 
|-id=451 bgcolor=#fefefe
| 125451 ||  || — || November 14, 2001 || Kitt Peak || Spacewatch || — || align=right data-sort-value="0.94" | 940 m || 
|-id=452 bgcolor=#fefefe
| 125452 || 2001 WK || — || November 16, 2001 || Kitt Peak || Spacewatch || — || align=right data-sort-value="0.92" | 920 m || 
|-id=453 bgcolor=#fefefe
| 125453 || 2001 WR || — || November 16, 2001 || Kitt Peak || Spacewatch || NYS || align=right | 2.2 km || 
|-id=454 bgcolor=#E9E9E9
| 125454 || 2001 WW || — || November 16, 2001 || Kitt Peak || Spacewatch || — || align=right | 3.2 km || 
|-id=455 bgcolor=#fefefe
| 125455 ||  || — || November 16, 2001 || Kitt Peak || Spacewatch || — || align=right | 1.1 km || 
|-id=456 bgcolor=#fefefe
| 125456 ||  || — || November 16, 2001 || Kitt Peak || Spacewatch || — || align=right | 1.2 km || 
|-id=457 bgcolor=#fefefe
| 125457 ||  || — || November 17, 2001 || Bisei SG Center || BATTeRS || — || align=right | 1.6 km || 
|-id=458 bgcolor=#FA8072
| 125458 ||  || — || November 17, 2001 || Socorro || LINEAR || — || align=right | 2.7 km || 
|-id=459 bgcolor=#fefefe
| 125459 ||  || — || November 20, 2001 || Ametlla de Mar || J. Nomen || ERI || align=right | 4.5 km || 
|-id=460 bgcolor=#fefefe
| 125460 ||  || — || November 22, 2001 || Oizumi || T. Kobayashi || NYS || align=right | 1.2 km || 
|-id=461 bgcolor=#fefefe
| 125461 ||  || — || November 17, 2001 || Socorro || LINEAR || — || align=right | 1.0 km || 
|-id=462 bgcolor=#fefefe
| 125462 ||  || — || November 17, 2001 || Socorro || LINEAR || FLO || align=right | 1.4 km || 
|-id=463 bgcolor=#fefefe
| 125463 ||  || — || November 17, 2001 || Socorro || LINEAR || — || align=right | 1.6 km || 
|-id=464 bgcolor=#fefefe
| 125464 ||  || — || November 17, 2001 || Socorro || LINEAR || — || align=right | 1.5 km || 
|-id=465 bgcolor=#E9E9E9
| 125465 ||  || — || November 17, 2001 || Socorro || LINEAR || — || align=right | 3.1 km || 
|-id=466 bgcolor=#E9E9E9
| 125466 ||  || — || November 17, 2001 || Socorro || LINEAR || — || align=right | 1.9 km || 
|-id=467 bgcolor=#E9E9E9
| 125467 ||  || — || November 17, 2001 || Socorro || LINEAR || — || align=right | 2.7 km || 
|-id=468 bgcolor=#E9E9E9
| 125468 ||  || — || November 17, 2001 || Socorro || LINEAR || — || align=right | 1.5 km || 
|-id=469 bgcolor=#fefefe
| 125469 ||  || — || November 17, 2001 || Socorro || LINEAR || — || align=right | 1.8 km || 
|-id=470 bgcolor=#fefefe
| 125470 ||  || — || November 17, 2001 || Socorro || LINEAR || — || align=right | 3.2 km || 
|-id=471 bgcolor=#fefefe
| 125471 ||  || — || November 17, 2001 || Socorro || LINEAR || — || align=right | 2.0 km || 
|-id=472 bgcolor=#FA8072
| 125472 ||  || — || November 21, 2001 || Socorro || LINEAR || — || align=right | 2.0 km || 
|-id=473 bgcolor=#fefefe
| 125473 Keisaku ||  ||  || November 20, 2001 || Kuma Kogen || A. Nakamura || FLO || align=right data-sort-value="0.99" | 990 m || 
|-id=474 bgcolor=#fefefe
| 125474 ||  || — || November 17, 2001 || Kitt Peak || Spacewatch || — || align=right | 1.7 km || 
|-id=475 bgcolor=#FA8072
| 125475 ||  || — || November 18, 2001 || Socorro || LINEAR || — || align=right | 1.2 km || 
|-id=476 bgcolor=#fefefe
| 125476 Frangarcia ||  ||  || November 27, 2001 || Pla D'Arguines || R. Ferrando || V || align=right | 1.2 km || 
|-id=477 bgcolor=#fefefe
| 125477 ||  || — || November 17, 2001 || Socorro || LINEAR || — || align=right | 1.0 km || 
|-id=478 bgcolor=#fefefe
| 125478 ||  || — || November 17, 2001 || Socorro || LINEAR || — || align=right | 1.5 km || 
|-id=479 bgcolor=#E9E9E9
| 125479 ||  || — || November 17, 2001 || Socorro || LINEAR || HEN || align=right | 2.2 km || 
|-id=480 bgcolor=#fefefe
| 125480 ||  || — || November 17, 2001 || Socorro || LINEAR || — || align=right | 1.9 km || 
|-id=481 bgcolor=#fefefe
| 125481 ||  || — || November 17, 2001 || Socorro || LINEAR || — || align=right | 1.4 km || 
|-id=482 bgcolor=#fefefe
| 125482 ||  || — || November 17, 2001 || Socorro || LINEAR || NYS || align=right | 1.1 km || 
|-id=483 bgcolor=#fefefe
| 125483 ||  || — || November 17, 2001 || Socorro || LINEAR || NYS || align=right data-sort-value="0.99" | 990 m || 
|-id=484 bgcolor=#fefefe
| 125484 ||  || — || November 17, 2001 || Socorro || LINEAR || — || align=right | 3.2 km || 
|-id=485 bgcolor=#fefefe
| 125485 ||  || — || November 17, 2001 || Socorro || LINEAR || — || align=right | 1.5 km || 
|-id=486 bgcolor=#fefefe
| 125486 ||  || — || November 17, 2001 || Kitt Peak || Spacewatch || NYS || align=right data-sort-value="0.99" | 990 m || 
|-id=487 bgcolor=#fefefe
| 125487 ||  || — || November 17, 2001 || Socorro || LINEAR || — || align=right | 3.5 km || 
|-id=488 bgcolor=#fefefe
| 125488 ||  || — || November 17, 2001 || Socorro || LINEAR || MAS || align=right data-sort-value="0.82" | 820 m || 
|-id=489 bgcolor=#fefefe
| 125489 ||  || — || November 17, 2001 || Socorro || LINEAR || — || align=right | 1.7 km || 
|-id=490 bgcolor=#fefefe
| 125490 ||  || — || November 17, 2001 || Socorro || LINEAR || V || align=right | 1.6 km || 
|-id=491 bgcolor=#E9E9E9
| 125491 ||  || — || November 17, 2001 || Socorro || LINEAR || — || align=right | 1.9 km || 
|-id=492 bgcolor=#fefefe
| 125492 ||  || — || November 17, 2001 || Socorro || LINEAR || — || align=right | 2.3 km || 
|-id=493 bgcolor=#fefefe
| 125493 ||  || — || November 17, 2001 || Socorro || LINEAR || NYS || align=right | 1.3 km || 
|-id=494 bgcolor=#fefefe
| 125494 ||  || — || November 17, 2001 || Socorro || LINEAR || — || align=right | 4.0 km || 
|-id=495 bgcolor=#E9E9E9
| 125495 ||  || — || November 17, 2001 || Socorro || LINEAR || — || align=right | 1.9 km || 
|-id=496 bgcolor=#E9E9E9
| 125496 ||  || — || November 17, 2001 || Socorro || LINEAR || MAR || align=right | 1.6 km || 
|-id=497 bgcolor=#E9E9E9
| 125497 ||  || — || November 17, 2001 || Socorro || LINEAR || — || align=right | 1.8 km || 
|-id=498 bgcolor=#E9E9E9
| 125498 ||  || — || November 17, 2001 || Socorro || LINEAR || EUN || align=right | 1.8 km || 
|-id=499 bgcolor=#fefefe
| 125499 ||  || — || November 17, 2001 || Socorro || LINEAR || — || align=right | 2.0 km || 
|-id=500 bgcolor=#fefefe
| 125500 ||  || — || November 17, 2001 || Socorro || LINEAR || FLO || align=right | 2.6 km || 
|}

125501–125600 

|-bgcolor=#fefefe
| 125501 ||  || — || November 17, 2001 || Socorro || LINEAR || V || align=right | 1.7 km || 
|-id=502 bgcolor=#E9E9E9
| 125502 ||  || — || November 17, 2001 || Socorro || LINEAR || — || align=right | 2.3 km || 
|-id=503 bgcolor=#fefefe
| 125503 ||  || — || November 17, 2001 || Socorro || LINEAR || V || align=right | 1.2 km || 
|-id=504 bgcolor=#fefefe
| 125504 ||  || — || November 17, 2001 || Socorro || LINEAR || NYS || align=right | 3.1 km || 
|-id=505 bgcolor=#fefefe
| 125505 ||  || — || November 17, 2001 || Socorro || LINEAR || NYS || align=right | 1.0 km || 
|-id=506 bgcolor=#E9E9E9
| 125506 ||  || — || November 17, 2001 || Socorro || LINEAR || — || align=right | 2.8 km || 
|-id=507 bgcolor=#fefefe
| 125507 ||  || — || November 17, 2001 || Socorro || LINEAR || NYS || align=right | 1.2 km || 
|-id=508 bgcolor=#E9E9E9
| 125508 ||  || — || November 17, 2001 || Socorro || LINEAR || — || align=right | 1.4 km || 
|-id=509 bgcolor=#fefefe
| 125509 ||  || — || November 17, 2001 || Socorro || LINEAR || — || align=right | 1.6 km || 
|-id=510 bgcolor=#fefefe
| 125510 ||  || — || November 17, 2001 || Socorro || LINEAR || FLO || align=right | 1.2 km || 
|-id=511 bgcolor=#fefefe
| 125511 ||  || — || November 17, 2001 || Socorro || LINEAR || — || align=right | 1.6 km || 
|-id=512 bgcolor=#fefefe
| 125512 ||  || — || November 17, 2001 || Socorro || LINEAR || — || align=right | 2.3 km || 
|-id=513 bgcolor=#fefefe
| 125513 ||  || — || November 17, 2001 || Socorro || LINEAR || — || align=right | 1.8 km || 
|-id=514 bgcolor=#E9E9E9
| 125514 ||  || — || November 17, 2001 || Socorro || LINEAR || — || align=right | 2.4 km || 
|-id=515 bgcolor=#E9E9E9
| 125515 ||  || — || November 17, 2001 || Socorro || LINEAR || EUN || align=right | 3.2 km || 
|-id=516 bgcolor=#E9E9E9
| 125516 ||  || — || November 17, 2001 || Socorro || LINEAR || GER || align=right | 3.8 km || 
|-id=517 bgcolor=#fefefe
| 125517 ||  || — || November 18, 2001 || Socorro || LINEAR || — || align=right | 2.0 km || 
|-id=518 bgcolor=#E9E9E9
| 125518 ||  || — || November 18, 2001 || Socorro || LINEAR || — || align=right | 2.6 km || 
|-id=519 bgcolor=#fefefe
| 125519 ||  || — || November 19, 2001 || Socorro || LINEAR || FLO || align=right | 1.1 km || 
|-id=520 bgcolor=#fefefe
| 125520 ||  || — || November 19, 2001 || Socorro || LINEAR || — || align=right | 1.7 km || 
|-id=521 bgcolor=#fefefe
| 125521 ||  || — || November 19, 2001 || Anderson Mesa || LONEOS || V || align=right | 1.2 km || 
|-id=522 bgcolor=#fefefe
| 125522 ||  || — || November 19, 2001 || Anderson Mesa || LONEOS || V || align=right | 1.2 km || 
|-id=523 bgcolor=#E9E9E9
| 125523 ||  || — || November 19, 2001 || Anderson Mesa || LONEOS || — || align=right | 1.9 km || 
|-id=524 bgcolor=#E9E9E9
| 125524 ||  || — || November 25, 2001 || Kingsnake || J. V. McClusky || EUN || align=right | 2.4 km || 
|-id=525 bgcolor=#fefefe
| 125525 ||  || — || November 19, 2001 || Socorro || LINEAR || — || align=right | 1.2 km || 
|-id=526 bgcolor=#fefefe
| 125526 ||  || — || November 19, 2001 || Socorro || LINEAR || — || align=right | 1.5 km || 
|-id=527 bgcolor=#E9E9E9
| 125527 ||  || — || November 19, 2001 || Socorro || LINEAR || — || align=right | 1.4 km || 
|-id=528 bgcolor=#fefefe
| 125528 ||  || — || November 19, 2001 || Socorro || LINEAR || V || align=right | 1.3 km || 
|-id=529 bgcolor=#fefefe
| 125529 ||  || — || November 20, 2001 || Socorro || LINEAR || V || align=right | 1.2 km || 
|-id=530 bgcolor=#E9E9E9
| 125530 ||  || — || November 20, 2001 || Socorro || LINEAR || — || align=right | 3.4 km || 
|-id=531 bgcolor=#fefefe
| 125531 ||  || — || November 20, 2001 || Socorro || LINEAR || V || align=right | 1.0 km || 
|-id=532 bgcolor=#fefefe
| 125532 ||  || — || November 20, 2001 || Socorro || LINEAR || — || align=right | 1.3 km || 
|-id=533 bgcolor=#fefefe
| 125533 ||  || — || November 20, 2001 || Socorro || LINEAR || — || align=right data-sort-value="0.99" | 990 m || 
|-id=534 bgcolor=#fefefe
| 125534 ||  || — || November 20, 2001 || Socorro || LINEAR || NYS || align=right | 3.0 km || 
|-id=535 bgcolor=#E9E9E9
| 125535 ||  || — || November 20, 2001 || Socorro || LINEAR || — || align=right | 2.0 km || 
|-id=536 bgcolor=#E9E9E9
| 125536 ||  || — || November 19, 2001 || Socorro || LINEAR || — || align=right | 4.1 km || 
|-id=537 bgcolor=#fefefe
| 125537 ||  || — || November 19, 2001 || Socorro || LINEAR || — || align=right | 1.3 km || 
|-id=538 bgcolor=#fefefe
| 125538 ||  || — || November 20, 2001 || Socorro || LINEAR || — || align=right | 1.8 km || 
|-id=539 bgcolor=#d6d6d6
| 125539 ||  || — || November 21, 2001 || Socorro || LINEAR || HYG || align=right | 7.4 km || 
|-id=540 bgcolor=#E9E9E9
| 125540 ||  || — || November 21, 2001 || Socorro || LINEAR || — || align=right | 3.4 km || 
|-id=541 bgcolor=#fefefe
| 125541 ||  || — || November 21, 2001 || Socorro || LINEAR || V || align=right | 1.1 km || 
|-id=542 bgcolor=#E9E9E9
| 125542 ||  || — || November 21, 2001 || Socorro || LINEAR || BRU || align=right | 8.1 km || 
|-id=543 bgcolor=#E9E9E9
| 125543 ||  || — || November 21, 2001 || Socorro || LINEAR || ADE || align=right | 4.8 km || 
|-id=544 bgcolor=#fefefe
| 125544 ||  || — || November 19, 2001 || Haleakala || NEAT || — || align=right | 1.4 km || 
|-id=545 bgcolor=#fefefe
| 125545 ||  || — || November 24, 2001 || Socorro || LINEAR || V || align=right | 1.1 km || 
|-id=546 bgcolor=#E9E9E9
| 125546 || 2001 XN || — || December 4, 2001 || Socorro || LINEAR || — || align=right | 2.6 km || 
|-id=547 bgcolor=#fefefe
| 125547 ||  || — || December 8, 2001 || Uccle || H. Boffin || SUL || align=right | 4.0 km || 
|-id=548 bgcolor=#fefefe
| 125548 ||  || — || December 9, 2001 || Socorro || LINEAR || — || align=right | 1.9 km || 
|-id=549 bgcolor=#fefefe
| 125549 ||  || — || December 9, 2001 || Socorro || LINEAR || PHO || align=right | 5.4 km || 
|-id=550 bgcolor=#E9E9E9
| 125550 ||  || — || December 7, 2001 || Socorro || LINEAR || — || align=right | 5.1 km || 
|-id=551 bgcolor=#fefefe
| 125551 ||  || — || December 7, 2001 || Socorro || LINEAR || — || align=right | 1.5 km || 
|-id=552 bgcolor=#E9E9E9
| 125552 ||  || — || December 11, 2001 || Socorro || LINEAR || BAR || align=right | 2.0 km || 
|-id=553 bgcolor=#E9E9E9
| 125553 ||  || — || December 8, 2001 || Socorro || LINEAR || — || align=right | 2.2 km || 
|-id=554 bgcolor=#fefefe
| 125554 ||  || — || December 9, 2001 || Socorro || LINEAR || — || align=right | 2.3 km || 
|-id=555 bgcolor=#fefefe
| 125555 ||  || — || December 9, 2001 || Socorro || LINEAR || ERI || align=right | 3.7 km || 
|-id=556 bgcolor=#fefefe
| 125556 ||  || — || December 9, 2001 || Socorro || LINEAR || V || align=right | 1.4 km || 
|-id=557 bgcolor=#E9E9E9
| 125557 ||  || — || December 9, 2001 || Socorro || LINEAR || — || align=right | 3.1 km || 
|-id=558 bgcolor=#fefefe
| 125558 ||  || — || December 9, 2001 || Socorro || LINEAR || FLO || align=right | 1.5 km || 
|-id=559 bgcolor=#fefefe
| 125559 ||  || — || December 9, 2001 || Socorro || LINEAR || — || align=right | 1.3 km || 
|-id=560 bgcolor=#fefefe
| 125560 ||  || — || December 9, 2001 || Socorro || LINEAR || V || align=right | 1.8 km || 
|-id=561 bgcolor=#fefefe
| 125561 ||  || — || December 9, 2001 || Socorro || LINEAR || — || align=right | 1.8 km || 
|-id=562 bgcolor=#fefefe
| 125562 ||  || — || December 9, 2001 || Socorro || LINEAR || V || align=right | 1.2 km || 
|-id=563 bgcolor=#fefefe
| 125563 ||  || — || December 10, 2001 || Socorro || LINEAR || FLO || align=right | 1.4 km || 
|-id=564 bgcolor=#fefefe
| 125564 ||  || — || December 10, 2001 || Socorro || LINEAR || — || align=right | 1.5 km || 
|-id=565 bgcolor=#E9E9E9
| 125565 ||  || — || December 11, 2001 || Uccle || T. Pauwels || — || align=right | 1.9 km || 
|-id=566 bgcolor=#fefefe
| 125566 ||  || — || December 9, 2001 || Socorro || LINEAR || — || align=right | 1.8 km || 
|-id=567 bgcolor=#fefefe
| 125567 ||  || — || December 9, 2001 || Socorro || LINEAR || — || align=right | 1.8 km || 
|-id=568 bgcolor=#fefefe
| 125568 ||  || — || December 9, 2001 || Socorro || LINEAR || V || align=right | 1.5 km || 
|-id=569 bgcolor=#fefefe
| 125569 ||  || — || December 9, 2001 || Socorro || LINEAR || FLO || align=right | 1.3 km || 
|-id=570 bgcolor=#E9E9E9
| 125570 ||  || — || December 9, 2001 || Socorro || LINEAR || ADE || align=right | 4.4 km || 
|-id=571 bgcolor=#fefefe
| 125571 ||  || — || December 9, 2001 || Socorro || LINEAR || — || align=right | 1.8 km || 
|-id=572 bgcolor=#fefefe
| 125572 ||  || — || December 9, 2001 || Socorro || LINEAR || — || align=right | 1.8 km || 
|-id=573 bgcolor=#fefefe
| 125573 ||  || — || December 9, 2001 || Socorro || LINEAR || V || align=right | 1.3 km || 
|-id=574 bgcolor=#fefefe
| 125574 ||  || — || December 9, 2001 || Socorro || LINEAR || V || align=right | 1.5 km || 
|-id=575 bgcolor=#E9E9E9
| 125575 ||  || — || December 9, 2001 || Socorro || LINEAR || — || align=right | 2.2 km || 
|-id=576 bgcolor=#d6d6d6
| 125576 ||  || — || December 9, 2001 || Socorro || LINEAR || — || align=right | 6.7 km || 
|-id=577 bgcolor=#fefefe
| 125577 ||  || — || December 9, 2001 || Socorro || LINEAR || — || align=right | 3.2 km || 
|-id=578 bgcolor=#fefefe
| 125578 ||  || — || December 9, 2001 || Socorro || LINEAR || V || align=right | 1.4 km || 
|-id=579 bgcolor=#fefefe
| 125579 ||  || — || December 10, 2001 || Socorro || LINEAR || — || align=right | 2.2 km || 
|-id=580 bgcolor=#fefefe
| 125580 ||  || — || December 10, 2001 || Socorro || LINEAR || FLO || align=right | 1.8 km || 
|-id=581 bgcolor=#fefefe
| 125581 ||  || — || December 10, 2001 || Socorro || LINEAR || — || align=right | 2.0 km || 
|-id=582 bgcolor=#E9E9E9
| 125582 ||  || — || December 10, 2001 || Socorro || LINEAR || — || align=right | 2.4 km || 
|-id=583 bgcolor=#fefefe
| 125583 ||  || — || December 10, 2001 || Socorro || LINEAR || V || align=right | 1.4 km || 
|-id=584 bgcolor=#E9E9E9
| 125584 ||  || — || December 10, 2001 || Socorro || LINEAR || — || align=right | 5.3 km || 
|-id=585 bgcolor=#fefefe
| 125585 ||  || — || December 10, 2001 || Socorro || LINEAR || — || align=right | 3.1 km || 
|-id=586 bgcolor=#E9E9E9
| 125586 ||  || — || December 11, 2001 || Socorro || LINEAR || GER || align=right | 3.0 km || 
|-id=587 bgcolor=#fefefe
| 125587 ||  || — || December 11, 2001 || Socorro || LINEAR || FLO || align=right | 1.9 km || 
|-id=588 bgcolor=#E9E9E9
| 125588 ||  || — || December 11, 2001 || Socorro || LINEAR || — || align=right | 1.7 km || 
|-id=589 bgcolor=#fefefe
| 125589 ||  || — || December 14, 2001 || Oizumi || T. Kobayashi || — || align=right | 3.7 km || 
|-id=590 bgcolor=#E9E9E9
| 125590 ||  || — || December 14, 2001 || Oizumi || T. Kobayashi || — || align=right | 1.8 km || 
|-id=591 bgcolor=#fefefe
| 125591 ||  || — || December 10, 2001 || Kitt Peak || Spacewatch || FLO || align=right | 1.2 km || 
|-id=592 bgcolor=#E9E9E9
| 125592 Buthiers ||  ||  || December 15, 2001 || Buthiers || J.-C. Merlin || — || align=right | 3.0 km || 
|-id=593 bgcolor=#fefefe
| 125593 ||  || — || December 9, 2001 || Socorro || LINEAR || — || align=right | 3.3 km || 
|-id=594 bgcolor=#E9E9E9
| 125594 ||  || — || December 9, 2001 || Socorro || LINEAR || — || align=right | 5.4 km || 
|-id=595 bgcolor=#E9E9E9
| 125595 ||  || — || December 9, 2001 || Socorro || LINEAR || — || align=right | 4.1 km || 
|-id=596 bgcolor=#E9E9E9
| 125596 ||  || — || December 9, 2001 || Socorro || LINEAR || — || align=right | 5.4 km || 
|-id=597 bgcolor=#fefefe
| 125597 ||  || — || December 9, 2001 || Socorro || LINEAR || — || align=right | 1.4 km || 
|-id=598 bgcolor=#E9E9E9
| 125598 ||  || — || December 9, 2001 || Socorro || LINEAR || — || align=right | 4.0 km || 
|-id=599 bgcolor=#fefefe
| 125599 ||  || — || December 9, 2001 || Socorro || LINEAR || V || align=right | 1.3 km || 
|-id=600 bgcolor=#fefefe
| 125600 ||  || — || December 9, 2001 || Socorro || LINEAR || — || align=right | 2.1 km || 
|}

125601–125700 

|-bgcolor=#fefefe
| 125601 ||  || — || December 9, 2001 || Socorro || LINEAR || — || align=right | 2.4 km || 
|-id=602 bgcolor=#E9E9E9
| 125602 ||  || — || December 9, 2001 || Socorro || LINEAR || — || align=right | 5.7 km || 
|-id=603 bgcolor=#fefefe
| 125603 ||  || — || December 9, 2001 || Socorro || LINEAR || — || align=right | 1.8 km || 
|-id=604 bgcolor=#E9E9E9
| 125604 ||  || — || December 10, 2001 || Socorro || LINEAR || — || align=right | 2.8 km || 
|-id=605 bgcolor=#E9E9E9
| 125605 ||  || — || December 10, 2001 || Socorro || LINEAR || — || align=right | 1.5 km || 
|-id=606 bgcolor=#fefefe
| 125606 ||  || — || December 10, 2001 || Socorro || LINEAR || — || align=right | 1.7 km || 
|-id=607 bgcolor=#E9E9E9
| 125607 ||  || — || December 10, 2001 || Socorro || LINEAR || — || align=right | 1.5 km || 
|-id=608 bgcolor=#fefefe
| 125608 ||  || — || December 10, 2001 || Socorro || LINEAR || ERI || align=right | 3.2 km || 
|-id=609 bgcolor=#fefefe
| 125609 ||  || — || December 10, 2001 || Socorro || LINEAR || NYS || align=right | 1.1 km || 
|-id=610 bgcolor=#fefefe
| 125610 ||  || — || December 10, 2001 || Socorro || LINEAR || MAS || align=right | 1.9 km || 
|-id=611 bgcolor=#fefefe
| 125611 ||  || — || December 10, 2001 || Socorro || LINEAR || EUT || align=right | 1.2 km || 
|-id=612 bgcolor=#fefefe
| 125612 ||  || — || December 10, 2001 || Socorro || LINEAR || MAS || align=right | 1.3 km || 
|-id=613 bgcolor=#fefefe
| 125613 ||  || — || December 10, 2001 || Socorro || LINEAR || NYS || align=right | 1.5 km || 
|-id=614 bgcolor=#fefefe
| 125614 ||  || — || December 10, 2001 || Socorro || LINEAR || V || align=right | 1.3 km || 
|-id=615 bgcolor=#fefefe
| 125615 ||  || — || December 10, 2001 || Socorro || LINEAR || — || align=right | 1.2 km || 
|-id=616 bgcolor=#E9E9E9
| 125616 ||  || — || December 10, 2001 || Socorro || LINEAR || — || align=right | 3.3 km || 
|-id=617 bgcolor=#fefefe
| 125617 ||  || — || December 11, 2001 || Socorro || LINEAR || — || align=right | 1.5 km || 
|-id=618 bgcolor=#fefefe
| 125618 ||  || — || December 10, 2001 || Socorro || LINEAR || NYS || align=right | 1.3 km || 
|-id=619 bgcolor=#fefefe
| 125619 ||  || — || December 10, 2001 || Socorro || LINEAR || V || align=right | 1.8 km || 
|-id=620 bgcolor=#fefefe
| 125620 ||  || — || December 10, 2001 || Socorro || LINEAR || MAS || align=right | 3.6 km || 
|-id=621 bgcolor=#fefefe
| 125621 ||  || — || December 10, 2001 || Socorro || LINEAR || — || align=right | 4.0 km || 
|-id=622 bgcolor=#fefefe
| 125622 ||  || — || December 10, 2001 || Socorro || LINEAR || MAS || align=right | 1.1 km || 
|-id=623 bgcolor=#fefefe
| 125623 ||  || — || December 10, 2001 || Socorro || LINEAR || — || align=right | 1.7 km || 
|-id=624 bgcolor=#fefefe
| 125624 ||  || — || December 10, 2001 || Socorro || LINEAR || NYS || align=right | 2.2 km || 
|-id=625 bgcolor=#fefefe
| 125625 ||  || — || December 10, 2001 || Socorro || LINEAR || — || align=right | 2.2 km || 
|-id=626 bgcolor=#fefefe
| 125626 ||  || — || December 10, 2001 || Socorro || LINEAR || — || align=right | 1.5 km || 
|-id=627 bgcolor=#fefefe
| 125627 ||  || — || December 10, 2001 || Socorro || LINEAR || NYS || align=right | 1.0 km || 
|-id=628 bgcolor=#E9E9E9
| 125628 ||  || — || December 10, 2001 || Socorro || LINEAR || — || align=right | 2.1 km || 
|-id=629 bgcolor=#fefefe
| 125629 ||  || — || December 10, 2001 || Socorro || LINEAR || MAS || align=right | 1.5 km || 
|-id=630 bgcolor=#fefefe
| 125630 ||  || — || December 10, 2001 || Socorro || LINEAR || MAS || align=right | 1.3 km || 
|-id=631 bgcolor=#fefefe
| 125631 ||  || — || December 10, 2001 || Socorro || LINEAR || — || align=right | 2.2 km || 
|-id=632 bgcolor=#fefefe
| 125632 ||  || — || December 10, 2001 || Socorro || LINEAR || — || align=right | 2.1 km || 
|-id=633 bgcolor=#E9E9E9
| 125633 ||  || — || December 10, 2001 || Socorro || LINEAR || — || align=right | 1.6 km || 
|-id=634 bgcolor=#fefefe
| 125634 ||  || — || December 10, 2001 || Socorro || LINEAR || V || align=right | 2.0 km || 
|-id=635 bgcolor=#E9E9E9
| 125635 ||  || — || December 10, 2001 || Socorro || LINEAR || — || align=right | 3.7 km || 
|-id=636 bgcolor=#E9E9E9
| 125636 ||  || — || December 10, 2001 || Socorro || LINEAR || EUN || align=right | 4.9 km || 
|-id=637 bgcolor=#fefefe
| 125637 ||  || — || December 10, 2001 || Socorro || LINEAR || NYS || align=right | 1.3 km || 
|-id=638 bgcolor=#E9E9E9
| 125638 ||  || — || December 10, 2001 || Socorro || LINEAR || — || align=right | 2.8 km || 
|-id=639 bgcolor=#fefefe
| 125639 ||  || — || December 10, 2001 || Socorro || LINEAR || V || align=right | 1.5 km || 
|-id=640 bgcolor=#fefefe
| 125640 ||  || — || December 10, 2001 || Socorro || LINEAR || NYS || align=right | 1.4 km || 
|-id=641 bgcolor=#E9E9E9
| 125641 ||  || — || December 10, 2001 || Socorro || LINEAR || — || align=right | 3.2 km || 
|-id=642 bgcolor=#fefefe
| 125642 ||  || — || December 10, 2001 || Socorro || LINEAR || NYS || align=right | 1.5 km || 
|-id=643 bgcolor=#E9E9E9
| 125643 ||  || — || December 10, 2001 || Socorro || LINEAR || — || align=right | 1.7 km || 
|-id=644 bgcolor=#fefefe
| 125644 ||  || — || December 10, 2001 || Socorro || LINEAR || NYS || align=right | 2.2 km || 
|-id=645 bgcolor=#fefefe
| 125645 ||  || — || December 10, 2001 || Socorro || LINEAR || V || align=right | 1.4 km || 
|-id=646 bgcolor=#fefefe
| 125646 ||  || — || December 10, 2001 || Socorro || LINEAR || — || align=right | 3.0 km || 
|-id=647 bgcolor=#fefefe
| 125647 ||  || — || December 10, 2001 || Socorro || LINEAR || NYS || align=right | 1.1 km || 
|-id=648 bgcolor=#fefefe
| 125648 ||  || — || December 10, 2001 || Socorro || LINEAR || — || align=right | 2.0 km || 
|-id=649 bgcolor=#fefefe
| 125649 ||  || — || December 10, 2001 || Socorro || LINEAR || FLO || align=right | 2.4 km || 
|-id=650 bgcolor=#E9E9E9
| 125650 ||  || — || December 11, 2001 || Socorro || LINEAR || — || align=right | 2.0 km || 
|-id=651 bgcolor=#E9E9E9
| 125651 ||  || — || December 11, 2001 || Socorro || LINEAR || — || align=right | 2.0 km || 
|-id=652 bgcolor=#fefefe
| 125652 ||  || — || December 11, 2001 || Socorro || LINEAR || — || align=right | 1.6 km || 
|-id=653 bgcolor=#fefefe
| 125653 ||  || — || December 11, 2001 || Socorro || LINEAR || — || align=right | 2.0 km || 
|-id=654 bgcolor=#fefefe
| 125654 ||  || — || December 11, 2001 || Socorro || LINEAR || V || align=right | 1.1 km || 
|-id=655 bgcolor=#fefefe
| 125655 ||  || — || December 11, 2001 || Socorro || LINEAR || V || align=right | 1.4 km || 
|-id=656 bgcolor=#fefefe
| 125656 ||  || — || December 11, 2001 || Socorro || LINEAR || V || align=right | 1.3 km || 
|-id=657 bgcolor=#fefefe
| 125657 ||  || — || December 11, 2001 || Socorro || LINEAR || V || align=right | 1.2 km || 
|-id=658 bgcolor=#fefefe
| 125658 ||  || — || December 11, 2001 || Socorro || LINEAR || FLO || align=right | 1.5 km || 
|-id=659 bgcolor=#fefefe
| 125659 ||  || — || December 11, 2001 || Socorro || LINEAR || — || align=right | 2.9 km || 
|-id=660 bgcolor=#fefefe
| 125660 ||  || — || December 11, 2001 || Socorro || LINEAR || — || align=right | 3.8 km || 
|-id=661 bgcolor=#fefefe
| 125661 ||  || — || December 11, 2001 || Socorro || LINEAR || NYS || align=right | 1.6 km || 
|-id=662 bgcolor=#E9E9E9
| 125662 ||  || — || December 11, 2001 || Socorro || LINEAR || — || align=right | 2.0 km || 
|-id=663 bgcolor=#E9E9E9
| 125663 ||  || — || December 11, 2001 || Socorro || LINEAR || — || align=right | 2.3 km || 
|-id=664 bgcolor=#E9E9E9
| 125664 ||  || — || December 11, 2001 || Socorro || LINEAR || — || align=right | 3.2 km || 
|-id=665 bgcolor=#E9E9E9
| 125665 ||  || — || December 11, 2001 || Socorro || LINEAR || XIZ || align=right | 2.2 km || 
|-id=666 bgcolor=#fefefe
| 125666 ||  || — || December 11, 2001 || Socorro || LINEAR || — || align=right | 1.8 km || 
|-id=667 bgcolor=#E9E9E9
| 125667 ||  || — || December 11, 2001 || Socorro || LINEAR || — || align=right | 2.0 km || 
|-id=668 bgcolor=#E9E9E9
| 125668 ||  || — || December 11, 2001 || Socorro || LINEAR || — || align=right | 1.4 km || 
|-id=669 bgcolor=#fefefe
| 125669 ||  || — || December 11, 2001 || Socorro || LINEAR || — || align=right | 1.2 km || 
|-id=670 bgcolor=#E9E9E9
| 125670 ||  || — || December 11, 2001 || Socorro || LINEAR || — || align=right | 3.1 km || 
|-id=671 bgcolor=#fefefe
| 125671 ||  || — || December 11, 2001 || Socorro || LINEAR || — || align=right | 1.2 km || 
|-id=672 bgcolor=#E9E9E9
| 125672 ||  || — || December 11, 2001 || Socorro || LINEAR || — || align=right | 3.0 km || 
|-id=673 bgcolor=#fefefe
| 125673 ||  || — || December 11, 2001 || Socorro || LINEAR || NYS || align=right | 2.8 km || 
|-id=674 bgcolor=#fefefe
| 125674 ||  || — || December 11, 2001 || Socorro || LINEAR || V || align=right | 1.5 km || 
|-id=675 bgcolor=#fefefe
| 125675 ||  || — || December 11, 2001 || Socorro || LINEAR || — || align=right | 1.7 km || 
|-id=676 bgcolor=#fefefe
| 125676 ||  || — || December 11, 2001 || Socorro || LINEAR || — || align=right | 2.3 km || 
|-id=677 bgcolor=#fefefe
| 125677 ||  || — || December 11, 2001 || Socorro || LINEAR || — || align=right | 1.4 km || 
|-id=678 bgcolor=#fefefe
| 125678 ||  || — || December 11, 2001 || Socorro || LINEAR || — || align=right | 2.8 km || 
|-id=679 bgcolor=#fefefe
| 125679 ||  || — || December 11, 2001 || Socorro || LINEAR || NYS || align=right | 1.1 km || 
|-id=680 bgcolor=#E9E9E9
| 125680 ||  || — || December 11, 2001 || Socorro || LINEAR || — || align=right | 2.9 km || 
|-id=681 bgcolor=#fefefe
| 125681 ||  || — || December 11, 2001 || Socorro || LINEAR || — || align=right | 1.8 km || 
|-id=682 bgcolor=#fefefe
| 125682 ||  || — || December 11, 2001 || Socorro || LINEAR || FLO || align=right | 1.0 km || 
|-id=683 bgcolor=#E9E9E9
| 125683 ||  || — || December 11, 2001 || Socorro || LINEAR || — || align=right | 1.9 km || 
|-id=684 bgcolor=#fefefe
| 125684 ||  || — || December 11, 2001 || Socorro || LINEAR || V || align=right | 1.4 km || 
|-id=685 bgcolor=#fefefe
| 125685 ||  || — || December 11, 2001 || Socorro || LINEAR || — || align=right | 1.6 km || 
|-id=686 bgcolor=#E9E9E9
| 125686 ||  || — || December 11, 2001 || Socorro || LINEAR || — || align=right | 3.1 km || 
|-id=687 bgcolor=#E9E9E9
| 125687 ||  || — || December 13, 2001 || Socorro || LINEAR || — || align=right | 4.0 km || 
|-id=688 bgcolor=#fefefe
| 125688 ||  || — || December 13, 2001 || Uccle || H. Boffin || — || align=right | 1.5 km || 
|-id=689 bgcolor=#fefefe
| 125689 ||  || — || December 10, 2001 || Socorro || LINEAR || — || align=right | 1.8 km || 
|-id=690 bgcolor=#fefefe
| 125690 ||  || — || December 10, 2001 || Socorro || LINEAR || FLO || align=right | 1.1 km || 
|-id=691 bgcolor=#fefefe
| 125691 ||  || — || December 10, 2001 || Socorro || LINEAR || — || align=right | 1.7 km || 
|-id=692 bgcolor=#fefefe
| 125692 ||  || — || December 10, 2001 || Socorro || LINEAR || — || align=right | 2.0 km || 
|-id=693 bgcolor=#fefefe
| 125693 ||  || — || December 10, 2001 || Socorro || LINEAR || FLO || align=right | 1.1 km || 
|-id=694 bgcolor=#fefefe
| 125694 ||  || — || December 10, 2001 || Socorro || LINEAR || NYS || align=right | 3.5 km || 
|-id=695 bgcolor=#fefefe
| 125695 ||  || — || December 10, 2001 || Socorro || LINEAR || — || align=right data-sort-value="0.89" | 890 m || 
|-id=696 bgcolor=#fefefe
| 125696 ||  || — || December 10, 2001 || Socorro || LINEAR || — || align=right | 1.6 km || 
|-id=697 bgcolor=#E9E9E9
| 125697 ||  || — || December 10, 2001 || Socorro || LINEAR || — || align=right | 1.3 km || 
|-id=698 bgcolor=#fefefe
| 125698 ||  || — || December 10, 2001 || Socorro || LINEAR || V || align=right data-sort-value="0.93" | 930 m || 
|-id=699 bgcolor=#fefefe
| 125699 ||  || — || December 10, 2001 || Socorro || LINEAR || — || align=right | 1.8 km || 
|-id=700 bgcolor=#fefefe
| 125700 ||  || — || December 10, 2001 || Socorro || LINEAR || ERI || align=right | 3.4 km || 
|}

125701–125800 

|-bgcolor=#E9E9E9
| 125701 ||  || — || December 10, 2001 || Socorro || LINEAR || — || align=right | 2.1 km || 
|-id=702 bgcolor=#E9E9E9
| 125702 ||  || — || December 10, 2001 || Socorro || LINEAR || — || align=right | 4.0 km || 
|-id=703 bgcolor=#E9E9E9
| 125703 ||  || — || December 10, 2001 || Socorro || LINEAR || — || align=right | 2.4 km || 
|-id=704 bgcolor=#fefefe
| 125704 ||  || — || December 10, 2001 || Socorro || LINEAR || V || align=right | 1.3 km || 
|-id=705 bgcolor=#fefefe
| 125705 ||  || — || December 10, 2001 || Socorro || LINEAR || — || align=right | 2.0 km || 
|-id=706 bgcolor=#E9E9E9
| 125706 ||  || — || December 10, 2001 || Socorro || LINEAR || — || align=right | 3.3 km || 
|-id=707 bgcolor=#fefefe
| 125707 ||  || — || December 10, 2001 || Socorro || LINEAR || — || align=right | 2.2 km || 
|-id=708 bgcolor=#E9E9E9
| 125708 ||  || — || December 10, 2001 || Socorro || LINEAR || ADE || align=right | 5.2 km || 
|-id=709 bgcolor=#fefefe
| 125709 ||  || — || December 10, 2001 || Socorro || LINEAR || NYS || align=right | 1.7 km || 
|-id=710 bgcolor=#E9E9E9
| 125710 ||  || — || December 10, 2001 || Socorro || LINEAR || — || align=right | 2.7 km || 
|-id=711 bgcolor=#fefefe
| 125711 ||  || — || December 10, 2001 || Socorro || LINEAR || — || align=right | 1.7 km || 
|-id=712 bgcolor=#fefefe
| 125712 ||  || — || December 10, 2001 || Socorro || LINEAR || — || align=right | 1.6 km || 
|-id=713 bgcolor=#fefefe
| 125713 ||  || — || December 10, 2001 || Socorro || LINEAR || — || align=right | 1.9 km || 
|-id=714 bgcolor=#E9E9E9
| 125714 ||  || — || December 10, 2001 || Socorro || LINEAR || — || align=right | 3.0 km || 
|-id=715 bgcolor=#fefefe
| 125715 ||  || — || December 10, 2001 || Socorro || LINEAR || — || align=right | 2.0 km || 
|-id=716 bgcolor=#E9E9E9
| 125716 ||  || — || December 10, 2001 || Socorro || LINEAR || — || align=right | 2.4 km || 
|-id=717 bgcolor=#fefefe
| 125717 ||  || — || December 10, 2001 || Socorro || LINEAR || — || align=right | 1.8 km || 
|-id=718 bgcolor=#fefefe
| 125718 Jemasalomon ||  ||  || December 15, 2001 || Buthiers || J.-C. Merlin || — || align=right | 2.3 km || 
|-id=719 bgcolor=#fefefe
| 125719 ||  || — || December 14, 2001 || Uccle || H. Boffin || — || align=right | 1.4 km || 
|-id=720 bgcolor=#fefefe
| 125720 ||  || — || December 10, 2001 || Socorro || LINEAR || V || align=right | 1.3 km || 
|-id=721 bgcolor=#E9E9E9
| 125721 ||  || — || December 10, 2001 || Socorro || LINEAR || — || align=right | 4.5 km || 
|-id=722 bgcolor=#fefefe
| 125722 ||  || — || December 10, 2001 || Socorro || LINEAR || NYS || align=right | 2.7 km || 
|-id=723 bgcolor=#fefefe
| 125723 ||  || — || December 10, 2001 || Socorro || LINEAR || CHL || align=right | 4.3 km || 
|-id=724 bgcolor=#E9E9E9
| 125724 ||  || — || December 10, 2001 || Socorro || LINEAR || — || align=right | 1.7 km || 
|-id=725 bgcolor=#fefefe
| 125725 ||  || — || December 10, 2001 || Socorro || LINEAR || — || align=right | 1.7 km || 
|-id=726 bgcolor=#fefefe
| 125726 ||  || — || December 11, 2001 || Socorro || LINEAR || V || align=right | 1.2 km || 
|-id=727 bgcolor=#fefefe
| 125727 ||  || — || December 11, 2001 || Socorro || LINEAR || FLO || align=right | 1.4 km || 
|-id=728 bgcolor=#fefefe
| 125728 ||  || — || December 11, 2001 || Socorro || LINEAR || — || align=right | 3.0 km || 
|-id=729 bgcolor=#d6d6d6
| 125729 ||  || — || December 11, 2001 || Socorro || LINEAR || — || align=right | 5.1 km || 
|-id=730 bgcolor=#fefefe
| 125730 ||  || — || December 11, 2001 || Socorro || LINEAR || — || align=right | 1.6 km || 
|-id=731 bgcolor=#E9E9E9
| 125731 ||  || — || December 11, 2001 || Socorro || LINEAR || — || align=right | 2.6 km || 
|-id=732 bgcolor=#fefefe
| 125732 ||  || — || December 11, 2001 || Socorro || LINEAR || — || align=right | 1.7 km || 
|-id=733 bgcolor=#fefefe
| 125733 ||  || — || December 11, 2001 || Socorro || LINEAR || FLO || align=right | 1.3 km || 
|-id=734 bgcolor=#fefefe
| 125734 ||  || — || December 13, 2001 || Socorro || LINEAR || V || align=right | 1.2 km || 
|-id=735 bgcolor=#fefefe
| 125735 ||  || — || December 13, 2001 || Socorro || LINEAR || — || align=right | 1.8 km || 
|-id=736 bgcolor=#fefefe
| 125736 ||  || — || December 13, 2001 || Socorro || LINEAR || — || align=right | 2.5 km || 
|-id=737 bgcolor=#E9E9E9
| 125737 ||  || — || December 13, 2001 || Socorro || LINEAR || MAR || align=right | 2.3 km || 
|-id=738 bgcolor=#fefefe
| 125738 ||  || — || December 13, 2001 || Socorro || LINEAR || FLO || align=right | 1.8 km || 
|-id=739 bgcolor=#fefefe
| 125739 ||  || — || December 13, 2001 || Socorro || LINEAR || NYS || align=right | 1.7 km || 
|-id=740 bgcolor=#fefefe
| 125740 ||  || — || December 13, 2001 || Socorro || LINEAR || FLO || align=right | 1.6 km || 
|-id=741 bgcolor=#fefefe
| 125741 ||  || — || December 13, 2001 || Socorro || LINEAR || V || align=right | 1.6 km || 
|-id=742 bgcolor=#fefefe
| 125742 ||  || — || December 13, 2001 || Socorro || LINEAR || — || align=right | 2.7 km || 
|-id=743 bgcolor=#E9E9E9
| 125743 ||  || — || December 13, 2001 || Socorro || LINEAR || — || align=right | 1.8 km || 
|-id=744 bgcolor=#E9E9E9
| 125744 ||  || — || December 13, 2001 || Socorro || LINEAR || — || align=right | 4.6 km || 
|-id=745 bgcolor=#E9E9E9
| 125745 ||  || — || December 13, 2001 || Socorro || LINEAR || — || align=right | 4.6 km || 
|-id=746 bgcolor=#E9E9E9
| 125746 ||  || — || December 13, 2001 || Socorro || LINEAR || — || align=right | 1.5 km || 
|-id=747 bgcolor=#fefefe
| 125747 ||  || — || December 14, 2001 || Socorro || LINEAR || — || align=right | 1.3 km || 
|-id=748 bgcolor=#E9E9E9
| 125748 ||  || — || December 14, 2001 || Socorro || LINEAR || — || align=right | 2.4 km || 
|-id=749 bgcolor=#fefefe
| 125749 ||  || — || December 14, 2001 || Socorro || LINEAR || FLO || align=right | 1.3 km || 
|-id=750 bgcolor=#fefefe
| 125750 ||  || — || December 14, 2001 || Socorro || LINEAR || EUT || align=right | 1.2 km || 
|-id=751 bgcolor=#E9E9E9
| 125751 ||  || — || December 14, 2001 || Socorro || LINEAR || — || align=right | 4.5 km || 
|-id=752 bgcolor=#fefefe
| 125752 ||  || — || December 14, 2001 || Socorro || LINEAR || — || align=right | 2.0 km || 
|-id=753 bgcolor=#fefefe
| 125753 ||  || — || December 14, 2001 || Socorro || LINEAR || — || align=right | 1.5 km || 
|-id=754 bgcolor=#E9E9E9
| 125754 ||  || — || December 14, 2001 || Socorro || LINEAR || — || align=right | 1.7 km || 
|-id=755 bgcolor=#fefefe
| 125755 ||  || — || December 14, 2001 || Socorro || LINEAR || — || align=right | 1.4 km || 
|-id=756 bgcolor=#fefefe
| 125756 ||  || — || December 14, 2001 || Socorro || LINEAR || — || align=right | 1.4 km || 
|-id=757 bgcolor=#d6d6d6
| 125757 ||  || — || December 14, 2001 || Socorro || LINEAR || KOR || align=right | 2.2 km || 
|-id=758 bgcolor=#fefefe
| 125758 ||  || — || December 14, 2001 || Socorro || LINEAR || SUL || align=right | 3.9 km || 
|-id=759 bgcolor=#E9E9E9
| 125759 ||  || — || December 14, 2001 || Socorro || LINEAR || — || align=right | 1.7 km || 
|-id=760 bgcolor=#fefefe
| 125760 ||  || — || December 14, 2001 || Socorro || LINEAR || — || align=right | 1.3 km || 
|-id=761 bgcolor=#fefefe
| 125761 ||  || — || December 14, 2001 || Socorro || LINEAR || — || align=right | 1.6 km || 
|-id=762 bgcolor=#fefefe
| 125762 ||  || — || December 14, 2001 || Socorro || LINEAR || — || align=right | 1.8 km || 
|-id=763 bgcolor=#fefefe
| 125763 ||  || — || December 14, 2001 || Socorro || LINEAR || — || align=right | 1.5 km || 
|-id=764 bgcolor=#fefefe
| 125764 ||  || — || December 14, 2001 || Socorro || LINEAR || — || align=right | 2.4 km || 
|-id=765 bgcolor=#E9E9E9
| 125765 ||  || — || December 14, 2001 || Socorro || LINEAR || — || align=right | 1.9 km || 
|-id=766 bgcolor=#E9E9E9
| 125766 ||  || — || December 14, 2001 || Socorro || LINEAR || — || align=right | 1.8 km || 
|-id=767 bgcolor=#E9E9E9
| 125767 ||  || — || December 14, 2001 || Socorro || LINEAR || HEN || align=right | 1.9 km || 
|-id=768 bgcolor=#E9E9E9
| 125768 ||  || — || December 14, 2001 || Socorro || LINEAR || — || align=right | 1.8 km || 
|-id=769 bgcolor=#fefefe
| 125769 ||  || — || December 14, 2001 || Socorro || LINEAR || — || align=right | 1.5 km || 
|-id=770 bgcolor=#E9E9E9
| 125770 ||  || — || December 14, 2001 || Socorro || LINEAR || — || align=right | 2.1 km || 
|-id=771 bgcolor=#fefefe
| 125771 ||  || — || December 14, 2001 || Socorro || LINEAR || V || align=right | 1.4 km || 
|-id=772 bgcolor=#d6d6d6
| 125772 ||  || — || December 14, 2001 || Socorro || LINEAR || — || align=right | 5.3 km || 
|-id=773 bgcolor=#fefefe
| 125773 ||  || — || December 14, 2001 || Socorro || LINEAR || V || align=right | 1.3 km || 
|-id=774 bgcolor=#E9E9E9
| 125774 ||  || — || December 14, 2001 || Socorro || LINEAR || — || align=right | 2.8 km || 
|-id=775 bgcolor=#fefefe
| 125775 ||  || — || December 14, 2001 || Socorro || LINEAR || FLO || align=right | 1.6 km || 
|-id=776 bgcolor=#E9E9E9
| 125776 ||  || — || December 14, 2001 || Socorro || LINEAR || — || align=right | 1.6 km || 
|-id=777 bgcolor=#E9E9E9
| 125777 ||  || — || December 14, 2001 || Socorro || LINEAR || — || align=right | 1.3 km || 
|-id=778 bgcolor=#fefefe
| 125778 ||  || — || December 14, 2001 || Socorro || LINEAR || V || align=right | 1.2 km || 
|-id=779 bgcolor=#E9E9E9
| 125779 ||  || — || December 14, 2001 || Socorro || LINEAR || — || align=right | 3.6 km || 
|-id=780 bgcolor=#fefefe
| 125780 ||  || — || December 14, 2001 || Socorro || LINEAR || — || align=right | 1.3 km || 
|-id=781 bgcolor=#fefefe
| 125781 ||  || — || December 14, 2001 || Socorro || LINEAR || V || align=right | 1.1 km || 
|-id=782 bgcolor=#fefefe
| 125782 ||  || — || December 14, 2001 || Socorro || LINEAR || — || align=right | 1.1 km || 
|-id=783 bgcolor=#E9E9E9
| 125783 ||  || — || December 14, 2001 || Socorro || LINEAR || — || align=right | 3.2 km || 
|-id=784 bgcolor=#E9E9E9
| 125784 ||  || — || December 14, 2001 || Socorro || LINEAR || HEN || align=right | 2.0 km || 
|-id=785 bgcolor=#fefefe
| 125785 ||  || — || December 14, 2001 || Socorro || LINEAR || V || align=right | 1.2 km || 
|-id=786 bgcolor=#fefefe
| 125786 ||  || — || December 14, 2001 || Socorro || LINEAR || — || align=right | 3.2 km || 
|-id=787 bgcolor=#E9E9E9
| 125787 ||  || — || December 14, 2001 || Socorro || LINEAR || — || align=right | 2.2 km || 
|-id=788 bgcolor=#E9E9E9
| 125788 ||  || — || December 14, 2001 || Socorro || LINEAR || — || align=right | 2.3 km || 
|-id=789 bgcolor=#E9E9E9
| 125789 ||  || — || December 14, 2001 || Socorro || LINEAR || — || align=right | 1.6 km || 
|-id=790 bgcolor=#fefefe
| 125790 ||  || — || December 14, 2001 || Socorro || LINEAR || — || align=right | 1.5 km || 
|-id=791 bgcolor=#fefefe
| 125791 ||  || — || December 14, 2001 || Socorro || LINEAR || — || align=right | 3.9 km || 
|-id=792 bgcolor=#E9E9E9
| 125792 ||  || — || December 14, 2001 || Socorro || LINEAR || — || align=right | 1.8 km || 
|-id=793 bgcolor=#fefefe
| 125793 ||  || — || December 14, 2001 || Socorro || LINEAR || MAS || align=right | 1.6 km || 
|-id=794 bgcolor=#E9E9E9
| 125794 ||  || — || December 14, 2001 || Socorro || LINEAR || AST || align=right | 3.0 km || 
|-id=795 bgcolor=#d6d6d6
| 125795 ||  || — || December 14, 2001 || Socorro || LINEAR || — || align=right | 4.2 km || 
|-id=796 bgcolor=#fefefe
| 125796 ||  || — || December 14, 2001 || Socorro || LINEAR || — || align=right | 1.7 km || 
|-id=797 bgcolor=#fefefe
| 125797 ||  || — || December 14, 2001 || Socorro || LINEAR || NYS || align=right | 1.4 km || 
|-id=798 bgcolor=#fefefe
| 125798 ||  || — || December 14, 2001 || Socorro || LINEAR || — || align=right | 1.4 km || 
|-id=799 bgcolor=#E9E9E9
| 125799 ||  || — || December 14, 2001 || Socorro || LINEAR || — || align=right | 2.3 km || 
|-id=800 bgcolor=#E9E9E9
| 125800 ||  || — || December 14, 2001 || Socorro || LINEAR || — || align=right | 1.4 km || 
|}

125801–125900 

|-bgcolor=#fefefe
| 125801 ||  || — || December 14, 2001 || Socorro || LINEAR || V || align=right | 1.8 km || 
|-id=802 bgcolor=#fefefe
| 125802 ||  || — || December 14, 2001 || Socorro || LINEAR || V || align=right | 1.5 km || 
|-id=803 bgcolor=#fefefe
| 125803 ||  || — || December 14, 2001 || Socorro || LINEAR || — || align=right | 2.3 km || 
|-id=804 bgcolor=#fefefe
| 125804 ||  || — || December 14, 2001 || Socorro || LINEAR || — || align=right | 2.8 km || 
|-id=805 bgcolor=#fefefe
| 125805 ||  || — || December 14, 2001 || Socorro || LINEAR || — || align=right | 1.00 km || 
|-id=806 bgcolor=#fefefe
| 125806 ||  || — || December 14, 2001 || Socorro || LINEAR || V || align=right | 1.2 km || 
|-id=807 bgcolor=#fefefe
| 125807 ||  || — || December 14, 2001 || Socorro || LINEAR || V || align=right | 1.4 km || 
|-id=808 bgcolor=#fefefe
| 125808 ||  || — || December 14, 2001 || Socorro || LINEAR || FLO || align=right | 1.4 km || 
|-id=809 bgcolor=#E9E9E9
| 125809 ||  || — || December 14, 2001 || Socorro || LINEAR || — || align=right | 3.0 km || 
|-id=810 bgcolor=#fefefe
| 125810 ||  || — || December 14, 2001 || Socorro || LINEAR || — || align=right | 1.5 km || 
|-id=811 bgcolor=#E9E9E9
| 125811 ||  || — || December 14, 2001 || Socorro || LINEAR || — || align=right | 3.0 km || 
|-id=812 bgcolor=#E9E9E9
| 125812 ||  || — || December 14, 2001 || Socorro || LINEAR || — || align=right | 1.6 km || 
|-id=813 bgcolor=#fefefe
| 125813 ||  || — || December 14, 2001 || Socorro || LINEAR || NYS || align=right | 1.6 km || 
|-id=814 bgcolor=#E9E9E9
| 125814 ||  || — || December 14, 2001 || Socorro || LINEAR || — || align=right | 3.4 km || 
|-id=815 bgcolor=#E9E9E9
| 125815 ||  || — || December 14, 2001 || Socorro || LINEAR || — || align=right | 2.0 km || 
|-id=816 bgcolor=#fefefe
| 125816 ||  || — || December 14, 2001 || Socorro || LINEAR || NYS || align=right | 2.8 km || 
|-id=817 bgcolor=#E9E9E9
| 125817 ||  || — || December 14, 2001 || Socorro || LINEAR || — || align=right | 1.9 km || 
|-id=818 bgcolor=#E9E9E9
| 125818 ||  || — || December 14, 2001 || Socorro || LINEAR || — || align=right | 4.1 km || 
|-id=819 bgcolor=#fefefe
| 125819 ||  || — || December 14, 2001 || Socorro || LINEAR || NYS || align=right | 1.5 km || 
|-id=820 bgcolor=#fefefe
| 125820 ||  || — || December 14, 2001 || Socorro || LINEAR || NYS || align=right | 1.3 km || 
|-id=821 bgcolor=#fefefe
| 125821 ||  || — || December 14, 2001 || Socorro || LINEAR || — || align=right | 1.4 km || 
|-id=822 bgcolor=#E9E9E9
| 125822 ||  || — || December 14, 2001 || Socorro || LINEAR || — || align=right | 4.7 km || 
|-id=823 bgcolor=#fefefe
| 125823 ||  || — || December 14, 2001 || Socorro || LINEAR || — || align=right | 1.3 km || 
|-id=824 bgcolor=#E9E9E9
| 125824 ||  || — || December 14, 2001 || Socorro || LINEAR || — || align=right | 3.1 km || 
|-id=825 bgcolor=#E9E9E9
| 125825 ||  || — || December 14, 2001 || Socorro || LINEAR || — || align=right | 2.3 km || 
|-id=826 bgcolor=#E9E9E9
| 125826 ||  || — || December 14, 2001 || Socorro || LINEAR || — || align=right | 2.3 km || 
|-id=827 bgcolor=#fefefe
| 125827 ||  || — || December 14, 2001 || Socorro || LINEAR || NYS || align=right | 1.3 km || 
|-id=828 bgcolor=#E9E9E9
| 125828 ||  || — || December 14, 2001 || Socorro || LINEAR || — || align=right | 1.7 km || 
|-id=829 bgcolor=#E9E9E9
| 125829 ||  || — || December 14, 2001 || Socorro || LINEAR || — || align=right | 2.7 km || 
|-id=830 bgcolor=#E9E9E9
| 125830 ||  || — || December 14, 2001 || Socorro || LINEAR || — || align=right | 2.5 km || 
|-id=831 bgcolor=#E9E9E9
| 125831 ||  || — || December 14, 2001 || Socorro || LINEAR || — || align=right | 1.8 km || 
|-id=832 bgcolor=#fefefe
| 125832 ||  || — || December 14, 2001 || Socorro || LINEAR || — || align=right | 1.2 km || 
|-id=833 bgcolor=#E9E9E9
| 125833 ||  || — || December 14, 2001 || Socorro || LINEAR || — || align=right | 4.4 km || 
|-id=834 bgcolor=#fefefe
| 125834 ||  || — || December 14, 2001 || Socorro || LINEAR || NYS || align=right | 2.0 km || 
|-id=835 bgcolor=#fefefe
| 125835 ||  || — || December 14, 2001 || Socorro || LINEAR || FLO || align=right | 1.4 km || 
|-id=836 bgcolor=#fefefe
| 125836 ||  || — || December 14, 2001 || Socorro || LINEAR || ERI || align=right | 3.5 km || 
|-id=837 bgcolor=#fefefe
| 125837 ||  || — || December 14, 2001 || Socorro || LINEAR || — || align=right | 1.1 km || 
|-id=838 bgcolor=#fefefe
| 125838 ||  || — || December 14, 2001 || Socorro || LINEAR || NYS || align=right | 1.2 km || 
|-id=839 bgcolor=#E9E9E9
| 125839 ||  || — || December 14, 2001 || Socorro || LINEAR || — || align=right | 2.7 km || 
|-id=840 bgcolor=#fefefe
| 125840 ||  || — || December 14, 2001 || Socorro || LINEAR || — || align=right | 2.2 km || 
|-id=841 bgcolor=#fefefe
| 125841 ||  || — || December 14, 2001 || Socorro || LINEAR || — || align=right | 2.3 km || 
|-id=842 bgcolor=#E9E9E9
| 125842 ||  || — || December 14, 2001 || Socorro || LINEAR || — || align=right | 5.1 km || 
|-id=843 bgcolor=#fefefe
| 125843 ||  || — || December 14, 2001 || Socorro || LINEAR || NYS || align=right | 1.2 km || 
|-id=844 bgcolor=#fefefe
| 125844 ||  || — || December 14, 2001 || Socorro || LINEAR || MAS || align=right | 1.2 km || 
|-id=845 bgcolor=#d6d6d6
| 125845 ||  || — || December 14, 2001 || Socorro || LINEAR || — || align=right | 7.9 km || 
|-id=846 bgcolor=#fefefe
| 125846 ||  || — || December 14, 2001 || Socorro || LINEAR || V || align=right | 1.4 km || 
|-id=847 bgcolor=#fefefe
| 125847 ||  || — || December 14, 2001 || Socorro || LINEAR || — || align=right | 1.6 km || 
|-id=848 bgcolor=#fefefe
| 125848 ||  || — || December 14, 2001 || Socorro || LINEAR || — || align=right | 1.8 km || 
|-id=849 bgcolor=#fefefe
| 125849 ||  || — || December 14, 2001 || Socorro || LINEAR || — || align=right | 1.2 km || 
|-id=850 bgcolor=#E9E9E9
| 125850 ||  || — || December 14, 2001 || Socorro || LINEAR || — || align=right | 3.3 km || 
|-id=851 bgcolor=#fefefe
| 125851 ||  || — || December 14, 2001 || Socorro || LINEAR || NYS || align=right | 1.1 km || 
|-id=852 bgcolor=#E9E9E9
| 125852 ||  || — || December 14, 2001 || Socorro || LINEAR || — || align=right | 2.9 km || 
|-id=853 bgcolor=#fefefe
| 125853 ||  || — || December 14, 2001 || Socorro || LINEAR || — || align=right | 1.6 km || 
|-id=854 bgcolor=#fefefe
| 125854 ||  || — || December 14, 2001 || Socorro || LINEAR || — || align=right | 1.5 km || 
|-id=855 bgcolor=#E9E9E9
| 125855 ||  || — || December 14, 2001 || Socorro || LINEAR || — || align=right | 2.6 km || 
|-id=856 bgcolor=#E9E9E9
| 125856 ||  || — || December 14, 2001 || Socorro || LINEAR || — || align=right | 2.5 km || 
|-id=857 bgcolor=#d6d6d6
| 125857 ||  || — || December 14, 2001 || Socorro || LINEAR || — || align=right | 3.3 km || 
|-id=858 bgcolor=#fefefe
| 125858 ||  || — || December 14, 2001 || Socorro || LINEAR || V || align=right | 1.3 km || 
|-id=859 bgcolor=#fefefe
| 125859 ||  || — || December 14, 2001 || Socorro || LINEAR || NYS || align=right | 1.2 km || 
|-id=860 bgcolor=#E9E9E9
| 125860 ||  || — || December 14, 2001 || Socorro || LINEAR || ADE || align=right | 3.7 km || 
|-id=861 bgcolor=#E9E9E9
| 125861 ||  || — || December 14, 2001 || Socorro || LINEAR || NEM || align=right | 3.8 km || 
|-id=862 bgcolor=#E9E9E9
| 125862 ||  || — || December 14, 2001 || Socorro || LINEAR || — || align=right | 2.8 km || 
|-id=863 bgcolor=#fefefe
| 125863 ||  || — || December 14, 2001 || Socorro || LINEAR || — || align=right | 2.3 km || 
|-id=864 bgcolor=#fefefe
| 125864 ||  || — || December 14, 2001 || Socorro || LINEAR || NYS || align=right | 1.5 km || 
|-id=865 bgcolor=#fefefe
| 125865 ||  || — || December 14, 2001 || Socorro || LINEAR || — || align=right | 1.6 km || 
|-id=866 bgcolor=#fefefe
| 125866 ||  || — || December 14, 2001 || Socorro || LINEAR || ERI || align=right | 3.7 km || 
|-id=867 bgcolor=#fefefe
| 125867 ||  || — || December 14, 2001 || Socorro || LINEAR || NYS || align=right | 1.1 km || 
|-id=868 bgcolor=#E9E9E9
| 125868 ||  || — || December 14, 2001 || Socorro || LINEAR || — || align=right | 1.8 km || 
|-id=869 bgcolor=#E9E9E9
| 125869 ||  || — || December 14, 2001 || Socorro || LINEAR || — || align=right | 1.8 km || 
|-id=870 bgcolor=#E9E9E9
| 125870 ||  || — || December 14, 2001 || Socorro || LINEAR || — || align=right | 2.4 km || 
|-id=871 bgcolor=#fefefe
| 125871 ||  || — || December 14, 2001 || Socorro || LINEAR || NYSfast? || align=right | 1.2 km || 
|-id=872 bgcolor=#fefefe
| 125872 ||  || — || December 14, 2001 || Socorro || LINEAR || NYS || align=right | 1.8 km || 
|-id=873 bgcolor=#E9E9E9
| 125873 ||  || — || December 14, 2001 || Socorro || LINEAR || — || align=right | 3.5 km || 
|-id=874 bgcolor=#E9E9E9
| 125874 ||  || — || December 14, 2001 || Socorro || LINEAR || — || align=right | 2.1 km || 
|-id=875 bgcolor=#E9E9E9
| 125875 ||  || — || December 14, 2001 || Socorro || LINEAR || — || align=right | 1.8 km || 
|-id=876 bgcolor=#fefefe
| 125876 ||  || — || December 14, 2001 || Socorro || LINEAR || — || align=right | 1.5 km || 
|-id=877 bgcolor=#E9E9E9
| 125877 ||  || — || December 14, 2001 || Socorro || LINEAR || EUN || align=right | 2.1 km || 
|-id=878 bgcolor=#E9E9E9
| 125878 ||  || — || December 14, 2001 || Socorro || LINEAR || — || align=right | 3.9 km || 
|-id=879 bgcolor=#E9E9E9
| 125879 ||  || — || December 14, 2001 || Socorro || LINEAR || — || align=right | 1.6 km || 
|-id=880 bgcolor=#E9E9E9
| 125880 ||  || — || December 9, 2001 || Bergisch Gladbach || W. Bickel || — || align=right | 2.3 km || 
|-id=881 bgcolor=#fefefe
| 125881 ||  || — || December 11, 2001 || Socorro || LINEAR || — || align=right | 1.3 km || 
|-id=882 bgcolor=#fefefe
| 125882 ||  || — || December 11, 2001 || Socorro || LINEAR || FLO || align=right | 1.4 km || 
|-id=883 bgcolor=#fefefe
| 125883 ||  || — || December 11, 2001 || Socorro || LINEAR || V || align=right | 1.5 km || 
|-id=884 bgcolor=#fefefe
| 125884 ||  || — || December 11, 2001 || Socorro || LINEAR || — || align=right | 1.2 km || 
|-id=885 bgcolor=#fefefe
| 125885 ||  || — || December 11, 2001 || Socorro || LINEAR || V || align=right | 1.5 km || 
|-id=886 bgcolor=#fefefe
| 125886 ||  || — || December 11, 2001 || Socorro || LINEAR || V || align=right | 1.2 km || 
|-id=887 bgcolor=#fefefe
| 125887 ||  || — || December 11, 2001 || Socorro || LINEAR || — || align=right | 2.0 km || 
|-id=888 bgcolor=#E9E9E9
| 125888 ||  || — || December 11, 2001 || Socorro || LINEAR || — || align=right | 3.5 km || 
|-id=889 bgcolor=#E9E9E9
| 125889 ||  || — || December 11, 2001 || Socorro || LINEAR || ADE || align=right | 2.8 km || 
|-id=890 bgcolor=#E9E9E9
| 125890 ||  || — || December 11, 2001 || Socorro || LINEAR || — || align=right | 4.1 km || 
|-id=891 bgcolor=#fefefe
| 125891 ||  || — || December 11, 2001 || Socorro || LINEAR || FLO || align=right | 1.2 km || 
|-id=892 bgcolor=#fefefe
| 125892 ||  || — || December 11, 2001 || Socorro || LINEAR || NYS || align=right | 2.6 km || 
|-id=893 bgcolor=#fefefe
| 125893 ||  || — || December 11, 2001 || Socorro || LINEAR || — || align=right | 1.6 km || 
|-id=894 bgcolor=#fefefe
| 125894 ||  || — || December 11, 2001 || Socorro || LINEAR || — || align=right | 1.9 km || 
|-id=895 bgcolor=#fefefe
| 125895 ||  || — || December 11, 2001 || Socorro || LINEAR || — || align=right | 2.4 km || 
|-id=896 bgcolor=#fefefe
| 125896 ||  || — || December 11, 2001 || Socorro || LINEAR || — || align=right | 1.5 km || 
|-id=897 bgcolor=#fefefe
| 125897 ||  || — || December 11, 2001 || Socorro || LINEAR || — || align=right | 1.5 km || 
|-id=898 bgcolor=#E9E9E9
| 125898 ||  || — || December 14, 2001 || Socorro || LINEAR || — || align=right | 1.7 km || 
|-id=899 bgcolor=#fefefe
| 125899 ||  || — || December 14, 2001 || Socorro || LINEAR || — || align=right | 1.4 km || 
|-id=900 bgcolor=#fefefe
| 125900 ||  || — || December 14, 2001 || Socorro || LINEAR || — || align=right | 2.1 km || 
|}

125901–126000 

|-bgcolor=#fefefe
| 125901 ||  || — || December 14, 2001 || Socorro || LINEAR || V || align=right | 1.3 km || 
|-id=902 bgcolor=#E9E9E9
| 125902 ||  || — || December 15, 2001 || Socorro || LINEAR || EUN || align=right | 2.4 km || 
|-id=903 bgcolor=#fefefe
| 125903 ||  || — || December 15, 2001 || Socorro || LINEAR || — || align=right | 1.3 km || 
|-id=904 bgcolor=#fefefe
| 125904 ||  || — || December 15, 2001 || Socorro || LINEAR || — || align=right | 1.2 km || 
|-id=905 bgcolor=#E9E9E9
| 125905 ||  || — || December 15, 2001 || Socorro || LINEAR || — || align=right | 3.0 km || 
|-id=906 bgcolor=#E9E9E9
| 125906 ||  || — || December 15, 2001 || Socorro || LINEAR || — || align=right | 1.3 km || 
|-id=907 bgcolor=#fefefe
| 125907 ||  || — || December 15, 2001 || Socorro || LINEAR || — || align=right | 1.3 km || 
|-id=908 bgcolor=#fefefe
| 125908 ||  || — || December 15, 2001 || Socorro || LINEAR || NYS || align=right | 3.2 km || 
|-id=909 bgcolor=#E9E9E9
| 125909 ||  || — || December 15, 2001 || Socorro || LINEAR || — || align=right | 2.0 km || 
|-id=910 bgcolor=#fefefe
| 125910 ||  || — || December 15, 2001 || Socorro || LINEAR || — || align=right | 1.2 km || 
|-id=911 bgcolor=#fefefe
| 125911 ||  || — || December 15, 2001 || Socorro || LINEAR || — || align=right | 2.0 km || 
|-id=912 bgcolor=#fefefe
| 125912 ||  || — || December 15, 2001 || Socorro || LINEAR || V || align=right | 1.3 km || 
|-id=913 bgcolor=#E9E9E9
| 125913 ||  || — || December 15, 2001 || Socorro || LINEAR || — || align=right | 2.4 km || 
|-id=914 bgcolor=#fefefe
| 125914 ||  || — || December 15, 2001 || Socorro || LINEAR || — || align=right | 1.5 km || 
|-id=915 bgcolor=#fefefe
| 125915 ||  || — || December 15, 2001 || Socorro || LINEAR || — || align=right | 1.6 km || 
|-id=916 bgcolor=#E9E9E9
| 125916 ||  || — || December 15, 2001 || Socorro || LINEAR || — || align=right | 2.3 km || 
|-id=917 bgcolor=#fefefe
| 125917 ||  || — || December 15, 2001 || Socorro || LINEAR || FLO || align=right | 3.1 km || 
|-id=918 bgcolor=#fefefe
| 125918 ||  || — || December 15, 2001 || Socorro || LINEAR || NYS || align=right | 3.0 km || 
|-id=919 bgcolor=#fefefe
| 125919 ||  || — || December 15, 2001 || Socorro || LINEAR || — || align=right | 1.8 km || 
|-id=920 bgcolor=#E9E9E9
| 125920 ||  || — || December 15, 2001 || Socorro || LINEAR || — || align=right | 4.0 km || 
|-id=921 bgcolor=#E9E9E9
| 125921 ||  || — || December 15, 2001 || Socorro || LINEAR || — || align=right | 1.9 km || 
|-id=922 bgcolor=#E9E9E9
| 125922 ||  || — || December 15, 2001 || Socorro || LINEAR || MRX || align=right | 1.9 km || 
|-id=923 bgcolor=#E9E9E9
| 125923 ||  || — || December 15, 2001 || Socorro || LINEAR || — || align=right | 1.6 km || 
|-id=924 bgcolor=#fefefe
| 125924 ||  || — || December 15, 2001 || Socorro || LINEAR || NYS || align=right | 5.0 km || 
|-id=925 bgcolor=#E9E9E9
| 125925 ||  || — || December 15, 2001 || Socorro || LINEAR || — || align=right | 1.7 km || 
|-id=926 bgcolor=#fefefe
| 125926 ||  || — || December 15, 2001 || Socorro || LINEAR || — || align=right | 1.3 km || 
|-id=927 bgcolor=#E9E9E9
| 125927 ||  || — || December 15, 2001 || Socorro || LINEAR || — || align=right | 1.9 km || 
|-id=928 bgcolor=#fefefe
| 125928 ||  || — || December 15, 2001 || Socorro || LINEAR || NYS || align=right | 1.5 km || 
|-id=929 bgcolor=#E9E9E9
| 125929 ||  || — || December 15, 2001 || Socorro || LINEAR || — || align=right | 2.7 km || 
|-id=930 bgcolor=#fefefe
| 125930 ||  || — || December 15, 2001 || Socorro || LINEAR || — || align=right | 2.0 km || 
|-id=931 bgcolor=#fefefe
| 125931 ||  || — || December 15, 2001 || Socorro || LINEAR || — || align=right | 1.7 km || 
|-id=932 bgcolor=#fefefe
| 125932 ||  || — || December 15, 2001 || Socorro || LINEAR || NYS || align=right | 1.5 km || 
|-id=933 bgcolor=#fefefe
| 125933 ||  || — || December 15, 2001 || Socorro || LINEAR || MAS || align=right | 1.2 km || 
|-id=934 bgcolor=#fefefe
| 125934 ||  || — || December 15, 2001 || Socorro || LINEAR || — || align=right | 1.9 km || 
|-id=935 bgcolor=#fefefe
| 125935 ||  || — || December 15, 2001 || Socorro || LINEAR || — || align=right | 1.6 km || 
|-id=936 bgcolor=#fefefe
| 125936 ||  || — || December 15, 2001 || Socorro || LINEAR || NYS || align=right | 1.3 km || 
|-id=937 bgcolor=#E9E9E9
| 125937 ||  || — || December 15, 2001 || Socorro || LINEAR || EUN || align=right | 3.3 km || 
|-id=938 bgcolor=#E9E9E9
| 125938 ||  || — || December 15, 2001 || Socorro || LINEAR || — || align=right | 2.8 km || 
|-id=939 bgcolor=#E9E9E9
| 125939 ||  || — || December 15, 2001 || Socorro || LINEAR || — || align=right | 2.0 km || 
|-id=940 bgcolor=#fefefe
| 125940 ||  || — || December 15, 2001 || Socorro || LINEAR || — || align=right | 1.4 km || 
|-id=941 bgcolor=#E9E9E9
| 125941 ||  || — || December 15, 2001 || Socorro || LINEAR || — || align=right | 3.0 km || 
|-id=942 bgcolor=#E9E9E9
| 125942 ||  || — || December 13, 2001 || Socorro || LINEAR || IAN || align=right | 2.1 km || 
|-id=943 bgcolor=#fefefe
| 125943 ||  || — || December 14, 2001 || Socorro || LINEAR || — || align=right | 1.8 km || 
|-id=944 bgcolor=#fefefe
| 125944 ||  || — || December 14, 2001 || Socorro || LINEAR || MAS || align=right | 1.2 km || 
|-id=945 bgcolor=#E9E9E9
| 125945 ||  || — || December 14, 2001 || Socorro || LINEAR || PAD || align=right | 2.9 km || 
|-id=946 bgcolor=#fefefe
| 125946 ||  || — || December 15, 2001 || Socorro || LINEAR || V || align=right | 1.4 km || 
|-id=947 bgcolor=#fefefe
| 125947 ||  || — || December 14, 2001 || Socorro || LINEAR || MAS || align=right | 1.3 km || 
|-id=948 bgcolor=#E9E9E9
| 125948 ||  || — || December 14, 2001 || Socorro || LINEAR || — || align=right | 2.4 km || 
|-id=949 bgcolor=#fefefe
| 125949 ||  || — || December 14, 2001 || Socorro || LINEAR || — || align=right | 1.5 km || 
|-id=950 bgcolor=#E9E9E9
| 125950 ||  || — || December 14, 2001 || Socorro || LINEAR || HEN || align=right | 2.0 km || 
|-id=951 bgcolor=#E9E9E9
| 125951 ||  || — || December 14, 2001 || Socorro || LINEAR || — || align=right | 1.9 km || 
|-id=952 bgcolor=#fefefe
| 125952 ||  || — || December 8, 2001 || Anderson Mesa || LONEOS || FLO || align=right | 1.9 km || 
|-id=953 bgcolor=#fefefe
| 125953 ||  || — || December 8, 2001 || Anderson Mesa || LONEOS || V || align=right | 1.0 km || 
|-id=954 bgcolor=#fefefe
| 125954 ||  || — || December 8, 2001 || Anderson Mesa || LONEOS || — || align=right | 2.1 km || 
|-id=955 bgcolor=#E9E9E9
| 125955 ||  || — || December 11, 2001 || Socorro || LINEAR || — || align=right | 3.5 km || 
|-id=956 bgcolor=#fefefe
| 125956 ||  || — || December 13, 2001 || Palomar || NEAT || FLO || align=right | 1.0 km || 
|-id=957 bgcolor=#fefefe
| 125957 ||  || — || December 14, 2001 || Palomar || NEAT || — || align=right | 1.2 km || 
|-id=958 bgcolor=#fefefe
| 125958 ||  || — || December 14, 2001 || Palomar || NEAT || FLO || align=right | 2.0 km || 
|-id=959 bgcolor=#fefefe
| 125959 ||  || — || December 14, 2001 || Palomar || NEAT || FLO || align=right | 1.4 km || 
|-id=960 bgcolor=#E9E9E9
| 125960 ||  || — || December 14, 2001 || Socorro || LINEAR || — || align=right | 2.7 km || 
|-id=961 bgcolor=#E9E9E9
| 125961 ||  || — || December 13, 2001 || Palomar || NEAT || KRM || align=right | 4.0 km || 
|-id=962 bgcolor=#fefefe
| 125962 ||  || — || December 17, 2001 || Palomar || NEAT || MAS || align=right | 1.3 km || 
|-id=963 bgcolor=#fefefe
| 125963 ||  || — || December 17, 2001 || Socorro || LINEAR || — || align=right | 1.7 km || 
|-id=964 bgcolor=#fefefe
| 125964 ||  || — || December 17, 2001 || Socorro || LINEAR || — || align=right | 1.6 km || 
|-id=965 bgcolor=#fefefe
| 125965 ||  || — || December 17, 2001 || Socorro || LINEAR || V || align=right | 1.2 km || 
|-id=966 bgcolor=#fefefe
| 125966 ||  || — || December 17, 2001 || Socorro || LINEAR || — || align=right | 3.4 km || 
|-id=967 bgcolor=#fefefe
| 125967 ||  || — || December 17, 2001 || Socorro || LINEAR || — || align=right | 1.7 km || 
|-id=968 bgcolor=#fefefe
| 125968 ||  || — || December 18, 2001 || Socorro || LINEAR || — || align=right | 2.5 km || 
|-id=969 bgcolor=#fefefe
| 125969 ||  || — || December 17, 2001 || Socorro || LINEAR || — || align=right | 1.3 km || 
|-id=970 bgcolor=#fefefe
| 125970 ||  || — || December 17, 2001 || Socorro || LINEAR || — || align=right | 1.7 km || 
|-id=971 bgcolor=#fefefe
| 125971 ||  || — || December 17, 2001 || Socorro || LINEAR || — || align=right | 1.7 km || 
|-id=972 bgcolor=#fefefe
| 125972 ||  || — || December 17, 2001 || Socorro || LINEAR || NYS || align=right | 1.2 km || 
|-id=973 bgcolor=#fefefe
| 125973 ||  || — || December 17, 2001 || Socorro || LINEAR || NYS || align=right | 1.0 km || 
|-id=974 bgcolor=#fefefe
| 125974 ||  || — || December 17, 2001 || Socorro || LINEAR || — || align=right | 1.5 km || 
|-id=975 bgcolor=#d6d6d6
| 125975 ||  || — || December 17, 2001 || Socorro || LINEAR || KOR || align=right | 2.2 km || 
|-id=976 bgcolor=#E9E9E9
| 125976 ||  || — || December 18, 2001 || Socorro || LINEAR || — || align=right | 3.9 km || 
|-id=977 bgcolor=#fefefe
| 125977 ||  || — || December 18, 2001 || Socorro || LINEAR || MAS || align=right | 1.2 km || 
|-id=978 bgcolor=#E9E9E9
| 125978 ||  || — || December 18, 2001 || Socorro || LINEAR || — || align=right | 2.2 km || 
|-id=979 bgcolor=#fefefe
| 125979 ||  || — || December 18, 2001 || Socorro || LINEAR || — || align=right | 1.3 km || 
|-id=980 bgcolor=#E9E9E9
| 125980 ||  || — || December 18, 2001 || Socorro || LINEAR || — || align=right | 3.0 km || 
|-id=981 bgcolor=#E9E9E9
| 125981 ||  || — || December 18, 2001 || Socorro || LINEAR || — || align=right | 1.7 km || 
|-id=982 bgcolor=#E9E9E9
| 125982 ||  || — || December 18, 2001 || Socorro || LINEAR || HEN || align=right | 1.6 km || 
|-id=983 bgcolor=#fefefe
| 125983 ||  || — || December 18, 2001 || Socorro || LINEAR || — || align=right | 1.7 km || 
|-id=984 bgcolor=#E9E9E9
| 125984 ||  || — || December 18, 2001 || Socorro || LINEAR || — || align=right | 2.2 km || 
|-id=985 bgcolor=#E9E9E9
| 125985 ||  || — || December 18, 2001 || Socorro || LINEAR || — || align=right | 1.9 km || 
|-id=986 bgcolor=#E9E9E9
| 125986 ||  || — || December 18, 2001 || Socorro || LINEAR || — || align=right | 1.8 km || 
|-id=987 bgcolor=#E9E9E9
| 125987 ||  || — || December 18, 2001 || Socorro || LINEAR || — || align=right | 2.8 km || 
|-id=988 bgcolor=#E9E9E9
| 125988 ||  || — || December 18, 2001 || Socorro || LINEAR || PAD || align=right | 3.3 km || 
|-id=989 bgcolor=#fefefe
| 125989 ||  || — || December 18, 2001 || Socorro || LINEAR || — || align=right | 1.4 km || 
|-id=990 bgcolor=#fefefe
| 125990 ||  || — || December 18, 2001 || Socorro || LINEAR || V || align=right | 1.6 km || 
|-id=991 bgcolor=#fefefe
| 125991 ||  || — || December 18, 2001 || Socorro || LINEAR || MAS || align=right | 1.0 km || 
|-id=992 bgcolor=#fefefe
| 125992 ||  || — || December 18, 2001 || Socorro || LINEAR || — || align=right | 1.7 km || 
|-id=993 bgcolor=#fefefe
| 125993 ||  || — || December 18, 2001 || Socorro || LINEAR || NYS || align=right | 1.4 km || 
|-id=994 bgcolor=#fefefe
| 125994 ||  || — || December 18, 2001 || Socorro || LINEAR || NYS || align=right | 1.5 km || 
|-id=995 bgcolor=#fefefe
| 125995 ||  || — || December 18, 2001 || Socorro || LINEAR || NYS || align=right | 1.1 km || 
|-id=996 bgcolor=#E9E9E9
| 125996 ||  || — || December 18, 2001 || Socorro || LINEAR || — || align=right | 1.6 km || 
|-id=997 bgcolor=#fefefe
| 125997 ||  || — || December 18, 2001 || Socorro || LINEAR || NYS || align=right | 3.3 km || 
|-id=998 bgcolor=#E9E9E9
| 125998 ||  || — || December 18, 2001 || Socorro || LINEAR || — || align=right | 1.9 km || 
|-id=999 bgcolor=#E9E9E9
| 125999 ||  || — || December 18, 2001 || Socorro || LINEAR || — || align=right | 2.7 km || 
|-id=000 bgcolor=#E9E9E9
| 126000 ||  || — || December 18, 2001 || Socorro || LINEAR || — || align=right | 1.8 km || 
|}

References

External links 
 Discovery Circumstances: Numbered Minor Planets (125001)–(130000) (IAU Minor Planet Center)

0125